= Milwaukee Art Museum =

Art museum in Wisconsin, United States

Milwaukee Art Museum (MAM)
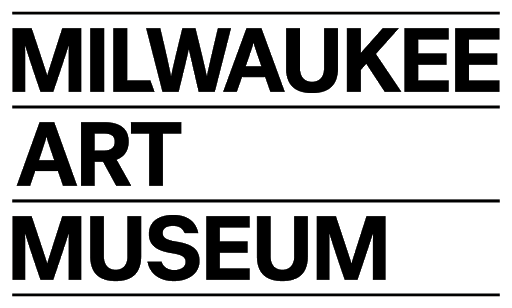

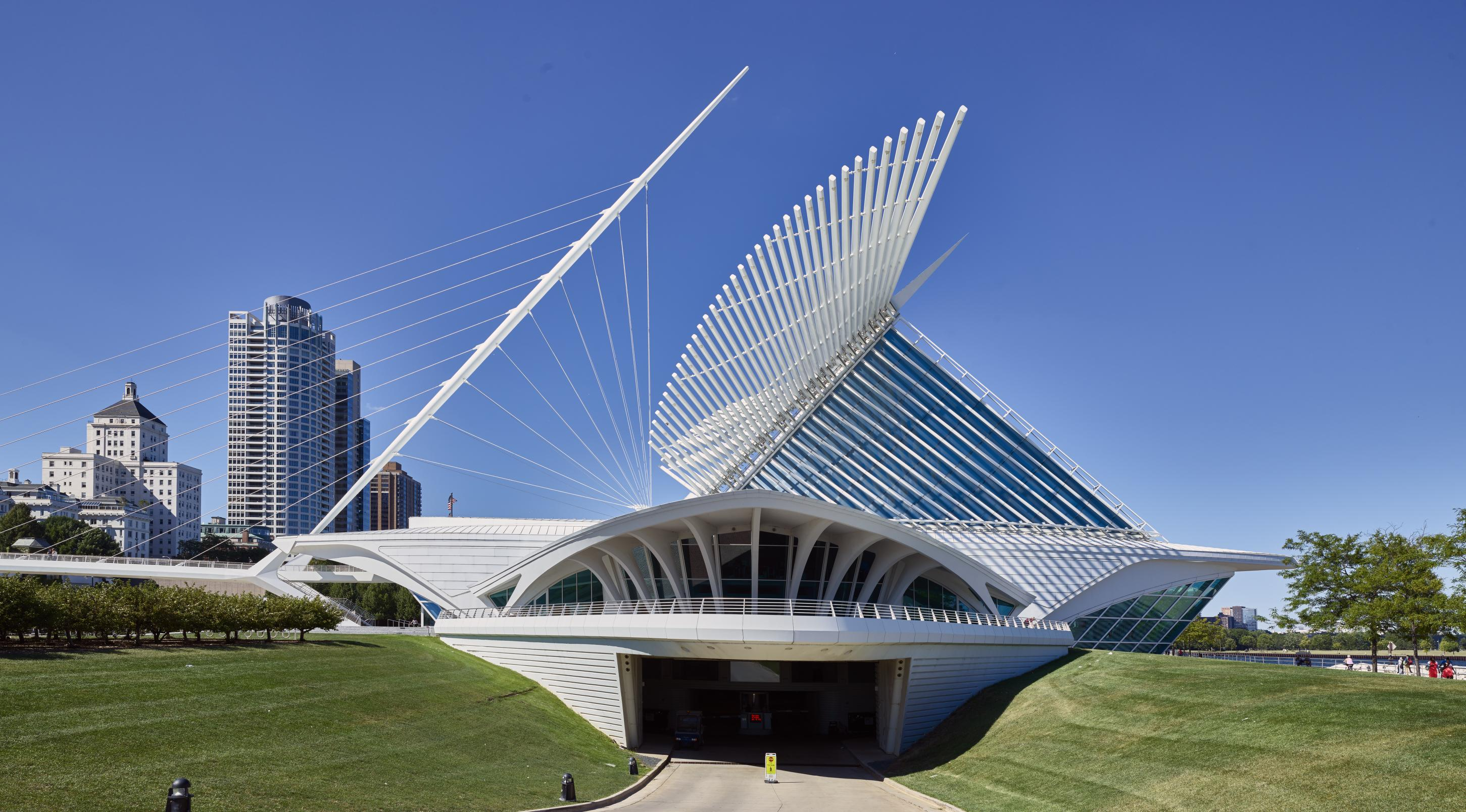
- The Museum's Quadracci Pavilion seen from the south
- Interactive fullscreen map
- Established: April 5, 1888; 138 years ago (Layton Art Gallery); November 11, 1957; 69 years ago (Milwaukee Art Center)
- Location: 700 N. Art Museum Drive; Milwaukee, Wisconsin; United States
- Coordinates: 43°02′24″N 87°53′50″W
- Type: Art museum
- Collection size: 35,000 works
- Visitors: 225,780 (2024)
- Director: Kim Sajet
- Architects: Eero Saarinen, David Kahler, Santiago Calatrava
- Public transit access: MCTS 14, 30, 33; The Hop L-Line
- Website: www.mam.org

The Milwaukee Art Museum (also referred to as MAM) is an art museum in Milwaukee, Wisconsin. Its collection of nearly 35,000 works of art and gallery spaces totaling 150,000 sq ft (14,000 m^{2}) make it the largest art museum in the state of Wisconsin and one of the largest art museums in the United States.

The Milwaukee Art Museum emerged from the reunion of two prior art institutions, the Layton Art Gallery and the Milwaukee Art Institute, both established in 1888. In 1957, they combined their collections inside the newly-completed Milwaukee County War Memorial designed by Finnish-American architect Eero Saarinen, forming the Milwaukee Arts Center (renamed Milwaukee Art Museum in 1980). Subsequent expansions included the David Kahler Building in 1975, the Quadracci Pavilion by Spanish architect Santiago Calatrava, inaugurated in 2001, and the East End entrance, opened in 2015.

Among highlights of the collection are paintings by American artists of the Ashcan School, American and European decorative arts, 19th-century German art and early-20th-century German Expressionist art, as well as folk and Haitian art. The museum also holds the fourth largest collection of works by Wisconsin-born artist Georgia O'Keeffe in the United States, behind the Georgia O'Keeffe Museum, National Gallery of Art, and LACMA.

In 2024, the Milwaukee Art Museum was ranked 8th best art museum in the country by the readers and editors of USA Today, one of the biggest US newspapers by number of subscribers and print circulation.

== Location and visit ==
Located on the lakefront of Lake Michigan, the Milwaukee Art Museum is one of the largest art museums in the Midwestern United States. Aside from its galleries, the museum includes the Lakeshore Café and a gift shop.

=== Hours ===
Normal operating hours are Wednesday, Friday, Saturday, and Sunday 10:00 a.m. to 5:00 p.m., and Thursday 10:00 a.m. to 8:00 p.m. The museum is closed on Mondays and Tuesdays.

== History ==
=== Origins to the 1960s ===
Beginning around 1870, multiple organizations were founded in order to bring an art gallery to Milwaukee, as the city was still a growing port town with few or no facilities to hold major art exhibitions. All attempts to build a major art gallery failed despite the presence of active art collectors in town, such as banker Alexander Mitchell, and manufacturers William Henry Metcalf and Charles Allis.

In 1883, local businessman Frederick Layton, a British immigrant who made his fortune through wholesale, meatpacking, and railroad ventures in Wisconsin, suggested establishing an art gallery for the city of Milwaukee. He commissioned Scottish architect George Ashdown Audsley, of the firm W. & G. Audsley, to design the building later known as the Layton Art Gallery. Audsley's Greek Revival, one-story building was inaugurated on April 5, 1888. Layton provided a $100,000 endowment to the new gallery for the acquisition of artworks, while part of his own collection was put on display. Wisconsin painters Edwin C. Eldridge and George Raab served as the gallery's first and second curators, respectively.

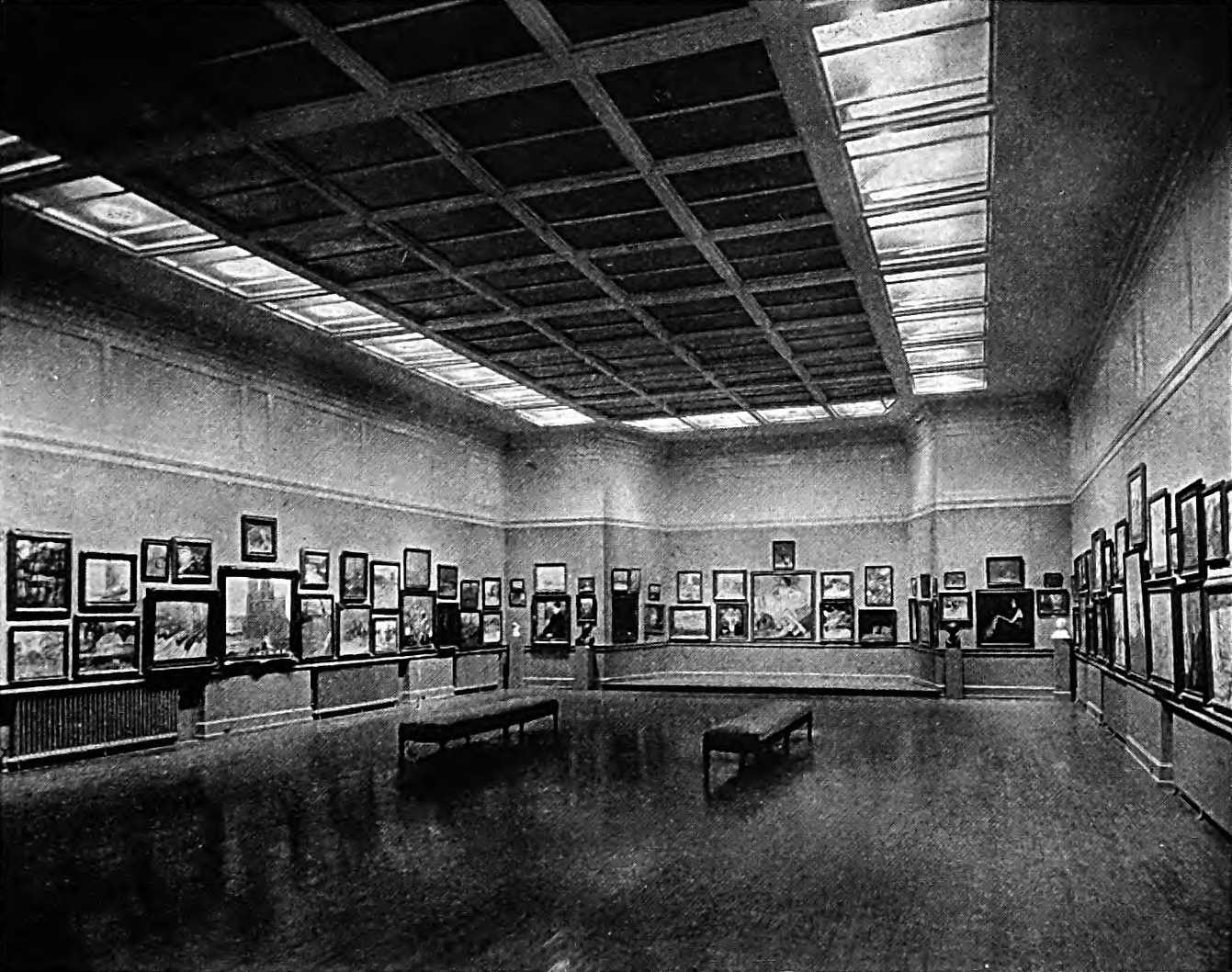
Main gallery of the Milwaukee Art Institute in 1922

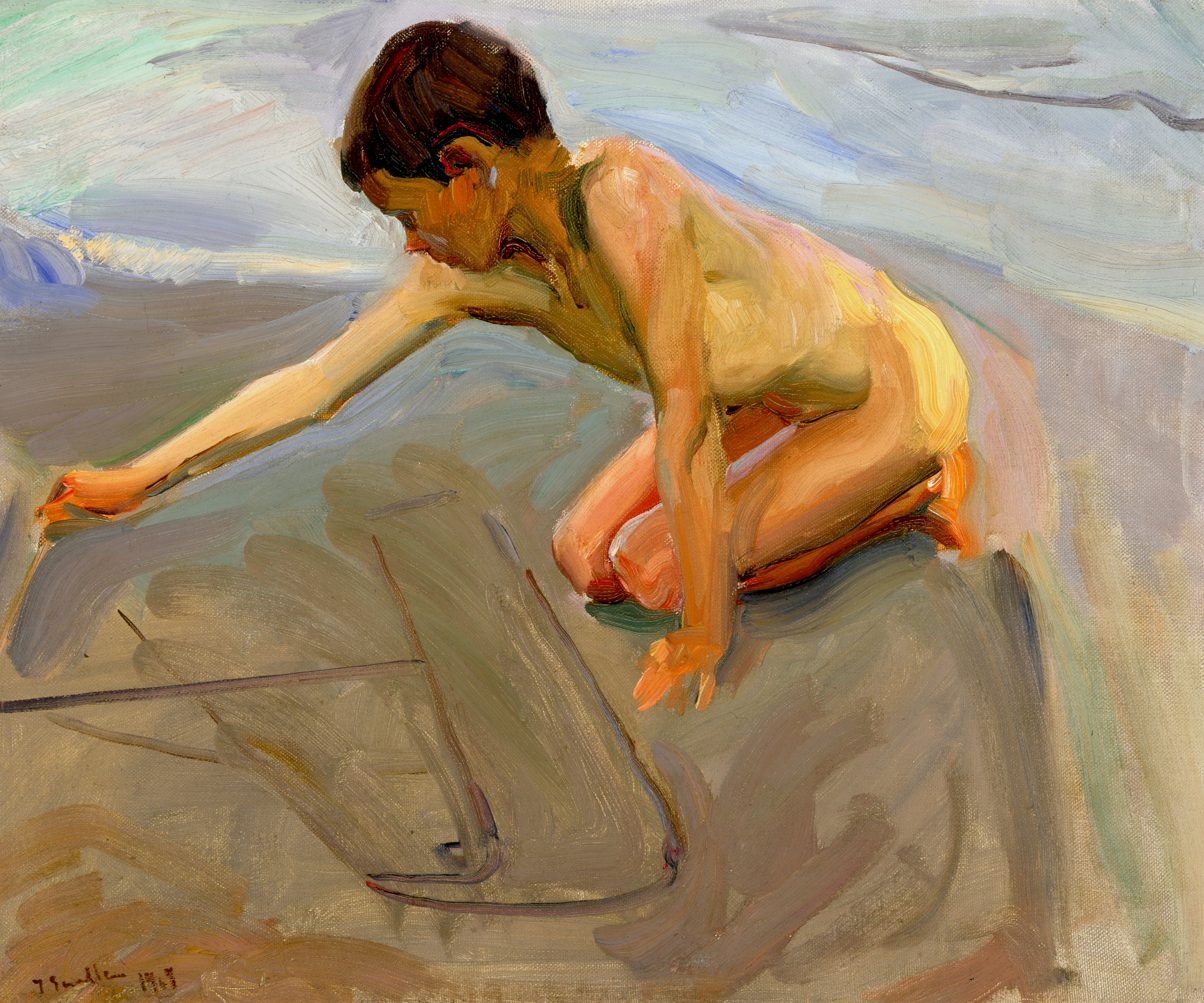
Drawing in the Sand (c. 1911) by Joaquín Sorolla, gift from the Buckner collection in 1919

In parallel, the Milwaukee Art Association (later Milwaukee Art Society), created by a group of German panorama artists and local businessmen, disputed the claim to be the city's first art gallery, having also been established in 1888. In 1911, it relocated to a new building adjacent to the Layton Art Gallery and eventually took on the name of Milwaukee Art Institute five years later. The institute's collection consisted mostly of gifts and purchases from Wisconsin artists, as well as gifts from the personal collection of one of its presidents, Samuel O. Buckner.

Following Frederick Layton's death, George Raab was replaced by educator Charlotte Partridge as curator and director of the Layton Art Gallery in 1922. Partridge had founded the Layton School of Art two years prior, and would continue to lead it along with her lifelong partner, art instructor Miriam Frink. During her tenure, she focused on contemporary art exhibitions and acquisitions, and additionally served as director of the Federal Art Project for Wisconsin from 1935 to 1939, as part of the Works Progress Administration, a New Deal agency. Meanwhile, the Milwaukee Art Institute came under the direction of German-born painter Alfred Pelikan in 1926, a position he occupied until 1942.

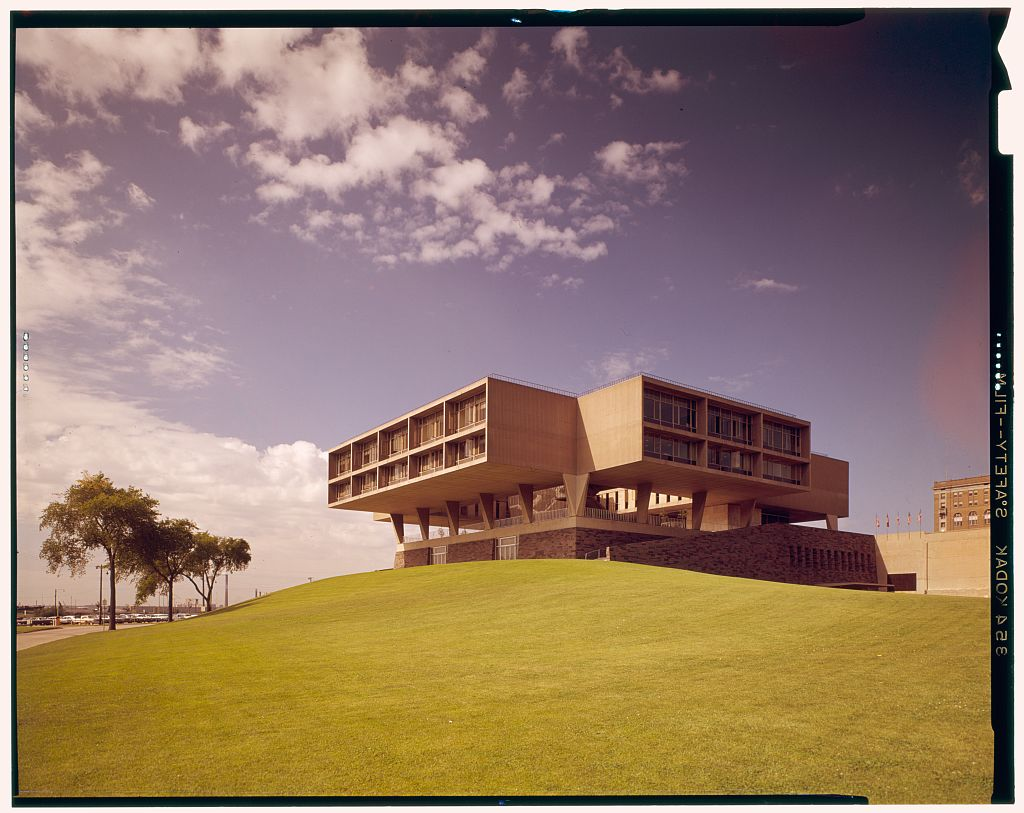
Milwaukee County War Memorial, c. 1957, photographed by Balthazar Korab

In 1954, Partridge retired from the Layton Art Gallery, while Frink retired from the directorship of the Layton School of Art, where she was replaced by artist Edmund Lewandowski. A year later, the Milwaukee Art Institute and Layton Art Gallery formed the Milwaukee Art Center, under the direction of art historian and museum curator Edward H. Dwight. The institution moved into the newly-built Eero Saarinen–designed Milwaukee County War Memorial and formally opened in 1957.

=== Kahler Building and folk art, 1975–2000 ===
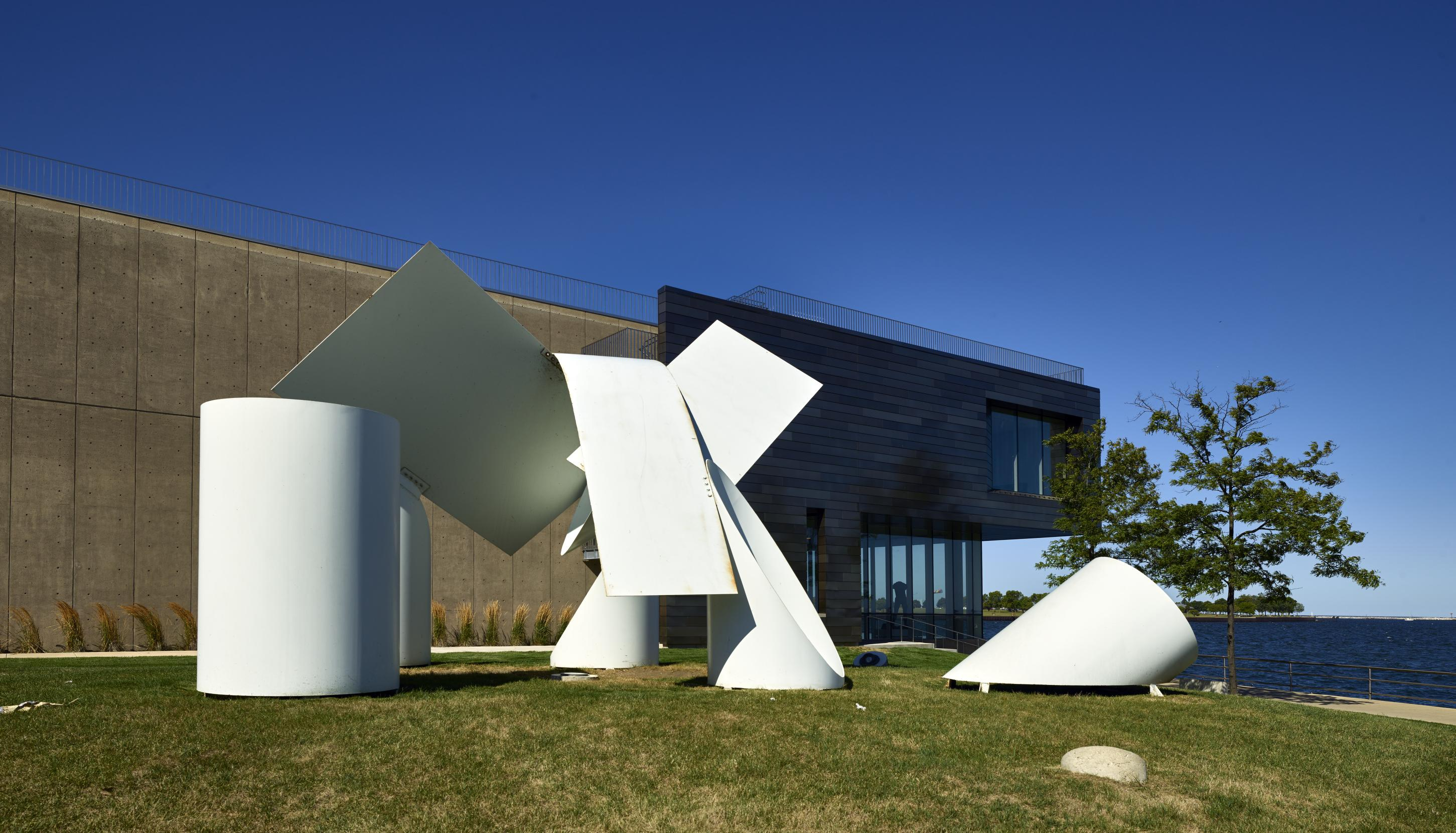
Alexander Liberman's sculpture Argo (1974), donated by Peg Bradley for the museum grounds

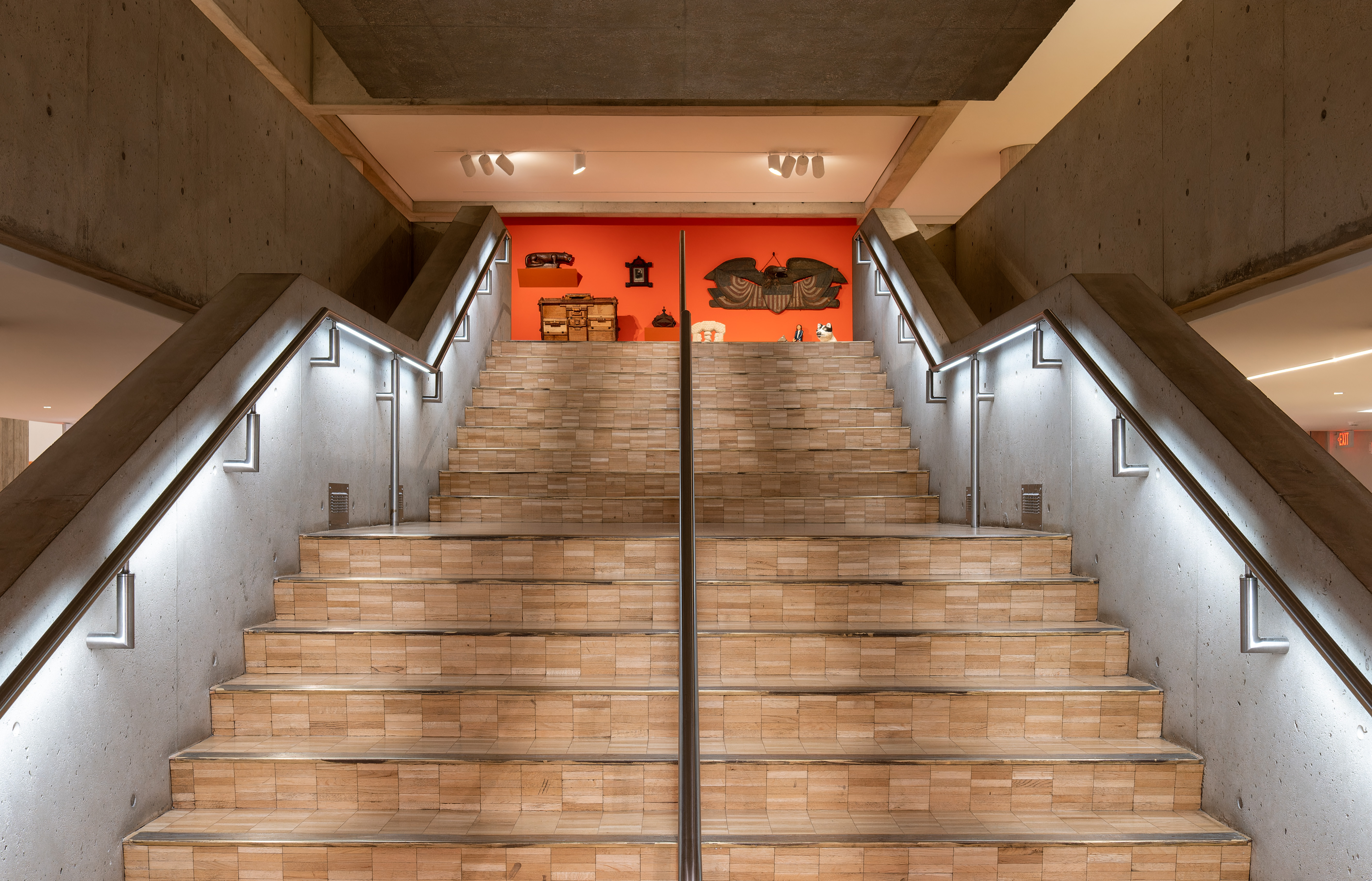
Main staircase of the Kahler building, leading to the folk art collection galleries

In 1975, Margaret (Peg) Bradley, the widow of industrialist Harry Lynde Bradley, donated an ensemble of more than 600 European and American Modern artworks to the museum. Highlights of the gift include Fauvist paintings, German Expressionist works by Wassily Kandinsky and Ernst Ludwig Kirchner, as well as a group of works by Georgia O'Keeffe. The brutalist Kahler Building (1975) was designed by architect David Kahler in response to the donation to house the museum's new Bradley Wing, as well as other suites of galleries for the collection. Peg Bradley herself contributed $1 million to the construction of the addition. In the wake of the Kahler expansion, the name of Milwaukee Art Museum was officially adopted by the institution in 1980.

In 1989, the gift of the Michael and Julie Hall Collection strengthened the museum's collection of folk and self-taught art. In 1999, the Milwaukee-based Chipstone Foundation established a partnership with the museum to display part of their collections of American decorative arts and furniture in dedicated galleries on a rotating basis.

=== Quadracci Pavilion, gardens, and further acquisitions, 2001–2015 ===
The Quadracci Pavilion, a multi-purpose 13,197-square-meter (142,050-square-foot) building including a reception hall, auditorium, exhibition space, and store, was designed by Spanish architect Santiago Calatrava and completed in 2001. The addition brought the total size of the museum to 341,000 sq ft (31,700 m^{2}).

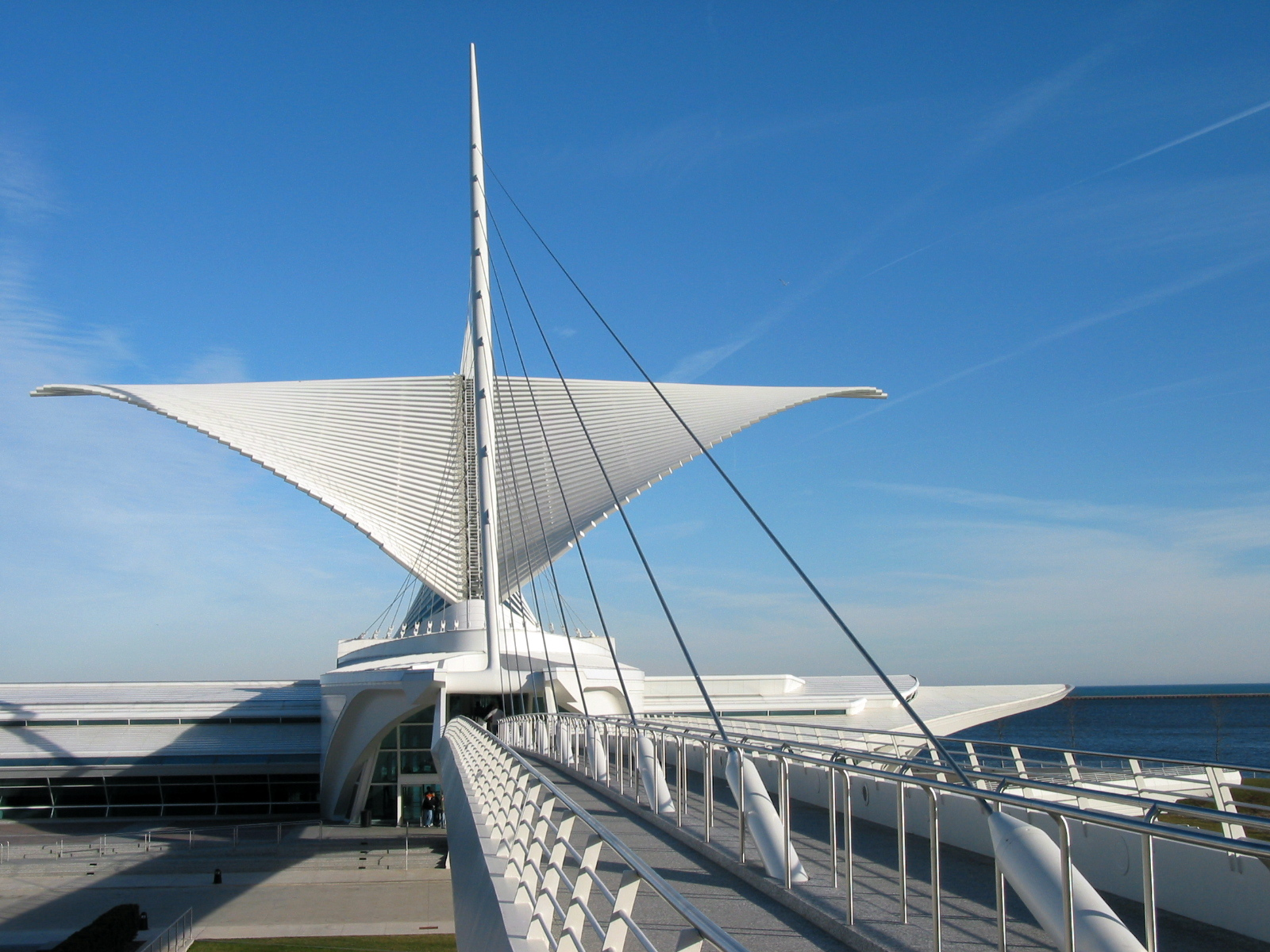
Reiman Pedestrian Bridge and open Burke brise soleil

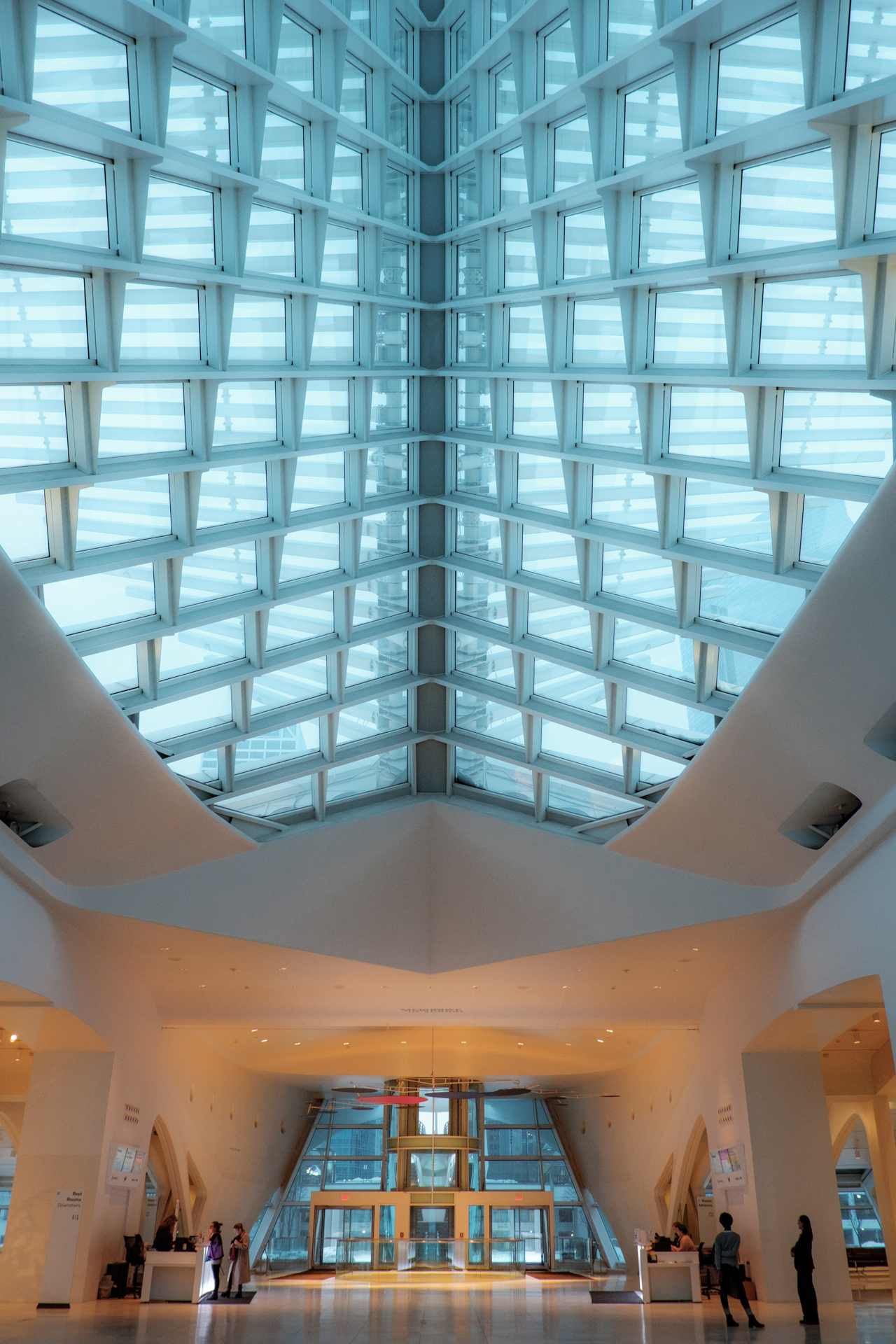
Windhover Hall and main entrance

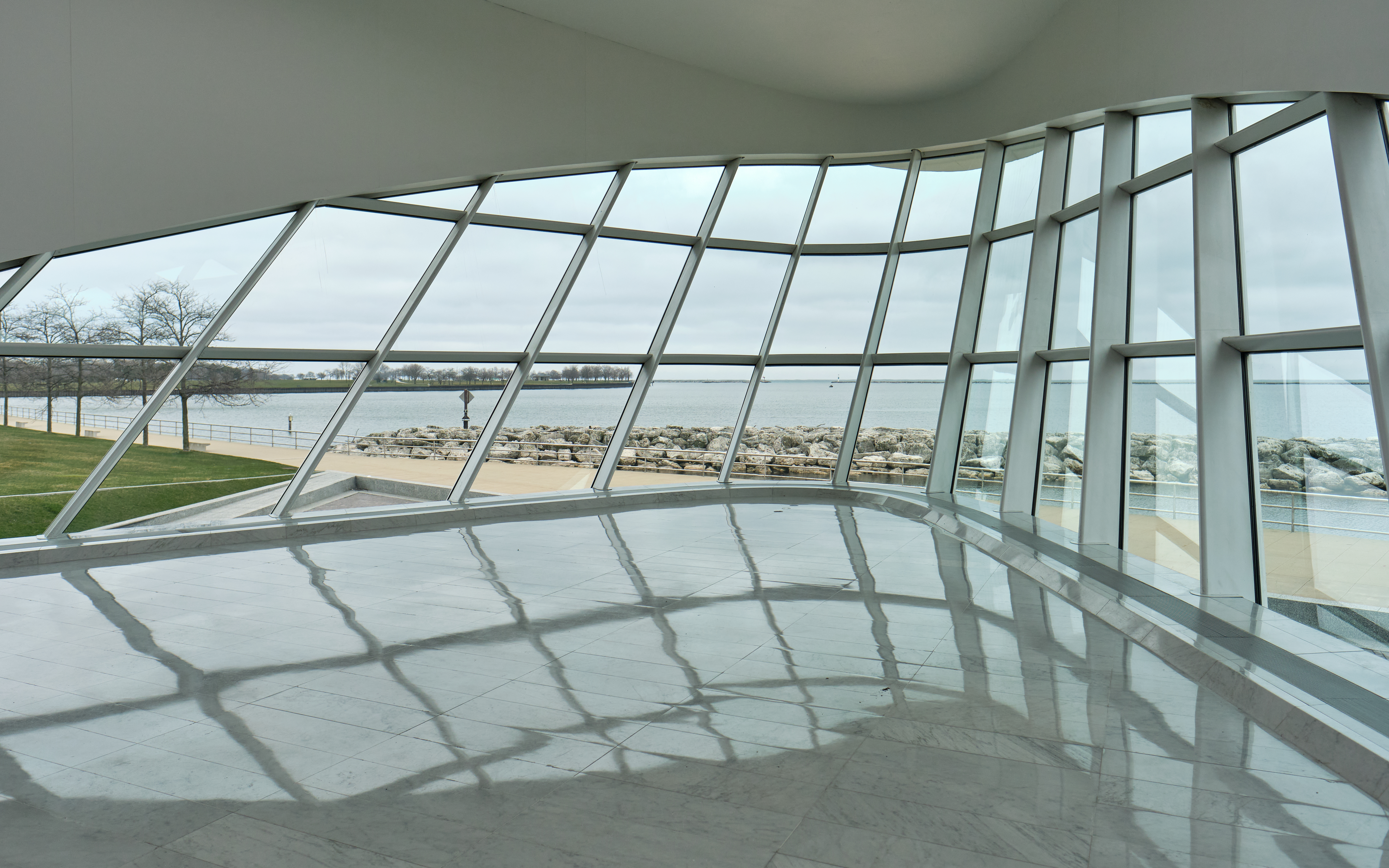
Windows overlooking Lake Michigan

The Cudahy Gardens were designed in conjunction with the Quadracci Pavilion by landscape architect Dan Kiley. This garden measures 600 feet by 100 feet, a rectangular shape that is divided into five lawns by a series of ten-foot-tall hedge lines. In this garden there is a center fountain that creates a 4-foot-tall water curtain. There are linden trees and crabapple trees scattered throughout this garden as well. The gardens were named after philanthropist Michael Cudahy, whose donations greatly contributed to their construction.

The year 2001 also saw the opening of the Herzfeld Photography, Print, and Drawing Study Center on the lower level of the Kahler Building, following a gift from the Milwaukee-based Richard and Ethel Herzfeld Foundation. In 2004, the museum acquired close to 300 American and European works through the gift of the collection of Maurice and Esther Leah Ritz. This was followed in 2010 and 2012 by the acquisition of close to 500 folk and self-taught American artworks from the collections of businessman Anthony Petullo and playwright Lanford Wilson, including paintings and sculpture by African American artists Bill Traylor, Clementine Hunter, William L. Hawkins, Joseph Yoakum, Minnie Evans, and Bessie Harvey.

=== Further expansions and Kim Sajet directorship (2015–) ===
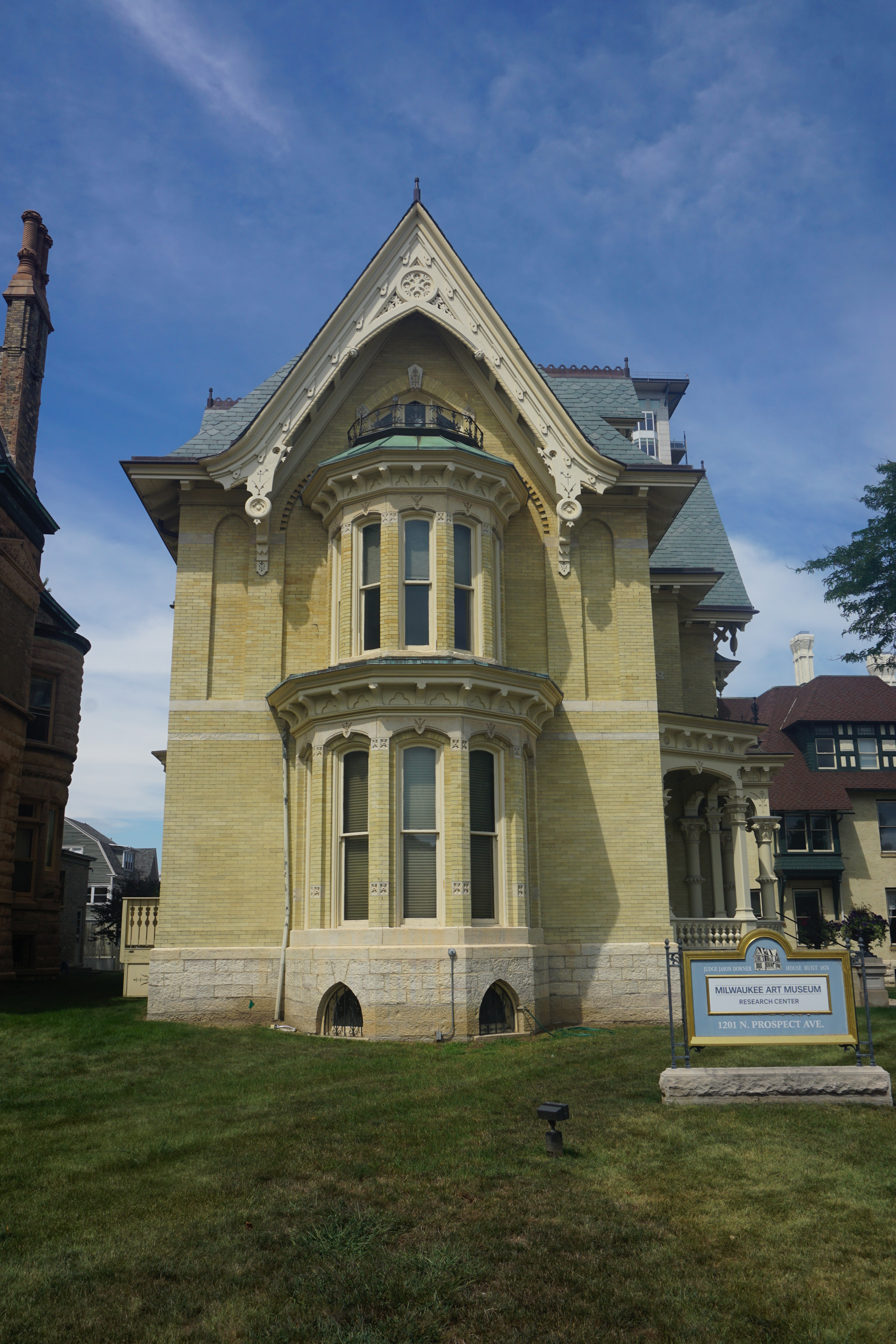
Judge Jason Downer Mansion, now the MAM Research Center

In November 2015, the museum opened a $34 million expansion funded jointly by a museum capital campaign and by Milwaukee County. The expansion was designed by Milwaukee architect James Shields and the HGA firm to provide additional gallery space, including a section devoted to light-based media, photography, and video installations. The two-story building's total size is 120,000 sq. ft., including a new atrium and lakefront-facing entry point for visitors. The design emerged after a lengthy process that included the main architect's temporary departure because of design disputes in 2014. Shortly after completion of the project, the museum announced the appointment of Marcelle Polednik as its new director, the first woman to lead the institution since the formation of the Milwaukee Art Center in 1957.

In 2017, the museum grouped its George Peckham Miller Art Research Library (established in 1916), its archives, and its manuscripts under a unique Milwaukee Art Museum Research Center, before relocating part of these collections to the historic Judge Jason Downer Mansion, in the neighborhood of Yankee Hill. The house was built in the High Victorian Gothic style for lawyer and former Wisconsin Supreme Court justice Jason Downer in 1874. It was added to the National Register of Historic Places in 1989, along with several properties, as part of the First Ward Triangle Historic District. Among archival collections preserved by the museum are the papers and drawings of industrial designer Brooks Stevens and interior designer George Mann Niedecken.

In December 2017, the museum announced its purchase of nearby O'Donnell Park from Milwaukee County. The institution had already commissioned the installation of The Calling, a public sculpture by American artist Mark di Suvero, on the site in 1982. In 2023, the park was officially renamed Museum Center Park.

In September 2025, Kim Sajet, who had resigned as the National Portrait Gallery's director earlier that year under pressure from US President Donald Trump, was appointed as the Milwaukee Art Museum's new director, becoming the second woman to lead the institution. That same month, the museum launched a celebration of the 50th anniversary of Peg Bradley's gift of art and the completion of the Kahler building by organizing a major exhibition and publishing a new catalogue of the Bradley collection.

== Collection ==
The museum houses over 34,000 works of art, a selection of which is presented on four floors, with works from antiquity to the present. Included in the collection are 15th- to 20th-century European and 17th- to 20th-century American paintings, sculpture, prints, drawings, decorative arts, photographs, and folk and self-taught art. Some artists represented include Gustave Caillebotte, Francisco de Zurbarán, Jean-Honoré Fragonard, Auguste Rodin, Edgar Degas, Claude Monet, Gabriele Münter, Henri de Toulouse-Lautrec, Frank Lloyd Wright, Pablo Picasso, Joan Miró, Wassily Kandinsky, Mark Rothko, Robert Gober, and Andy Warhol.

It also has paintings by European painters Francesco Botticini, Jan Swart van Groningen, Jan van Goyen, Franz von Lenbach, Ferdinand Waldmüller, Carl Spitzweg, William-Adolphe Bouguereau, Jean-Léon Gérôme, Gustave Caillebotte, Camille Pissarro, Jules Bastien-Lepage, and Max Pechstein.

== Gallery ==
=== European paintings ===
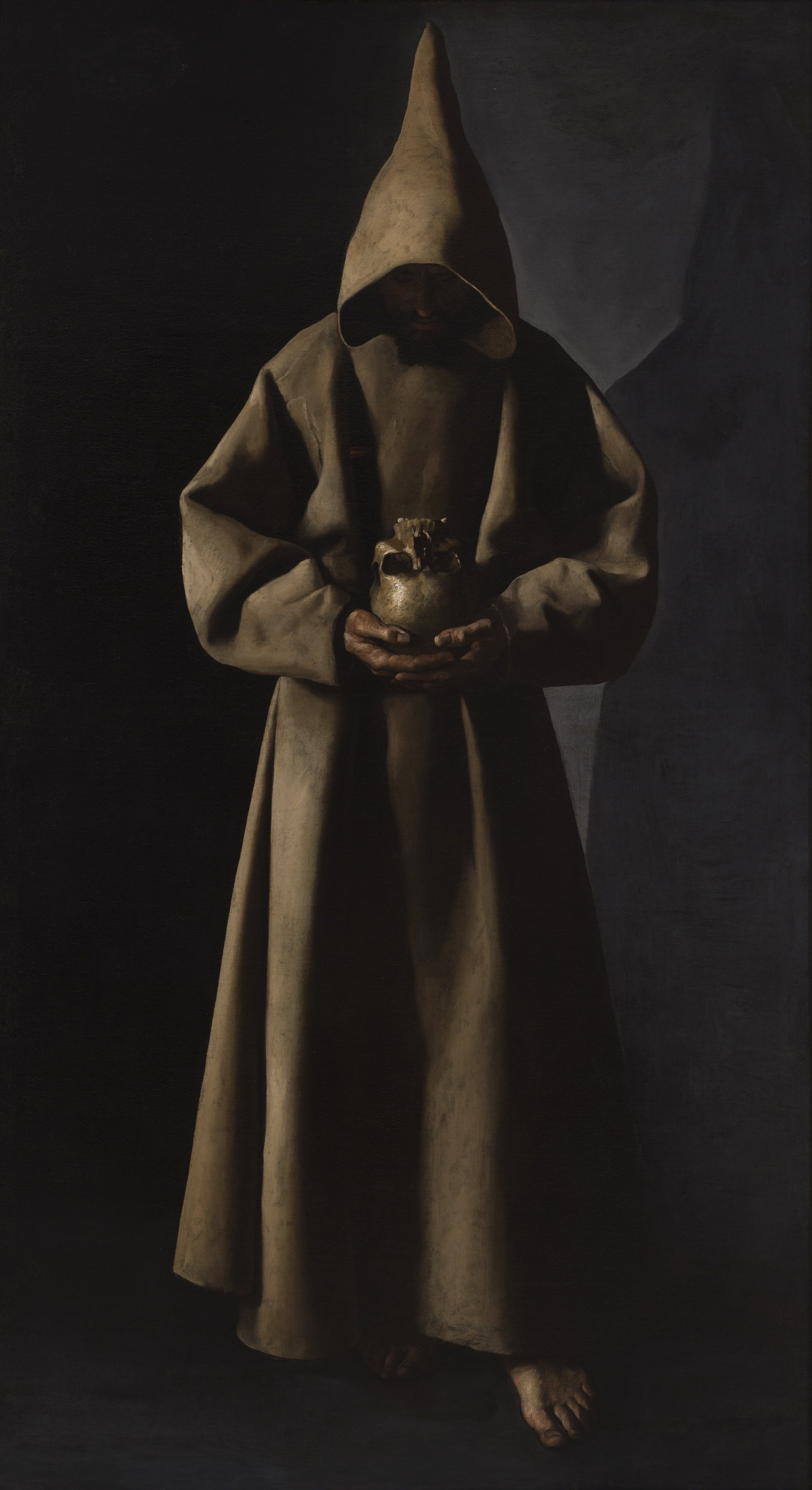
Francisco de Zurbarán, Saint Francis of Assisi in His Tomb, 1630–34

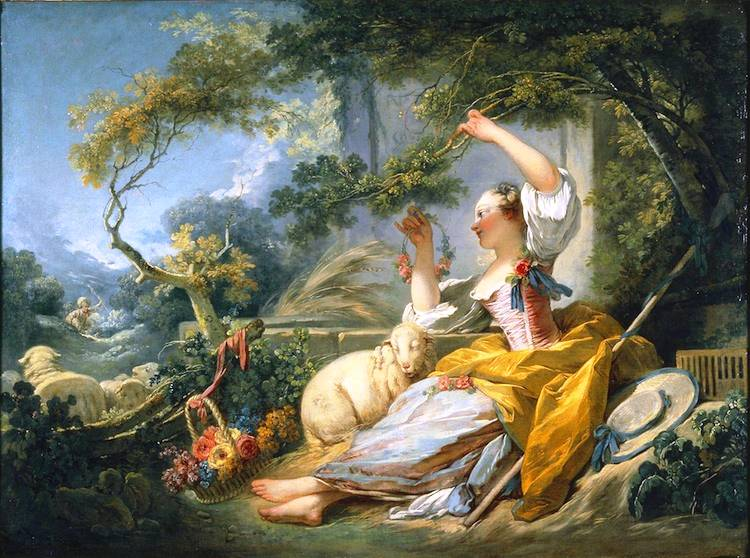
Jean-Honoré Fragonard, The Shepherdess, 1750–52

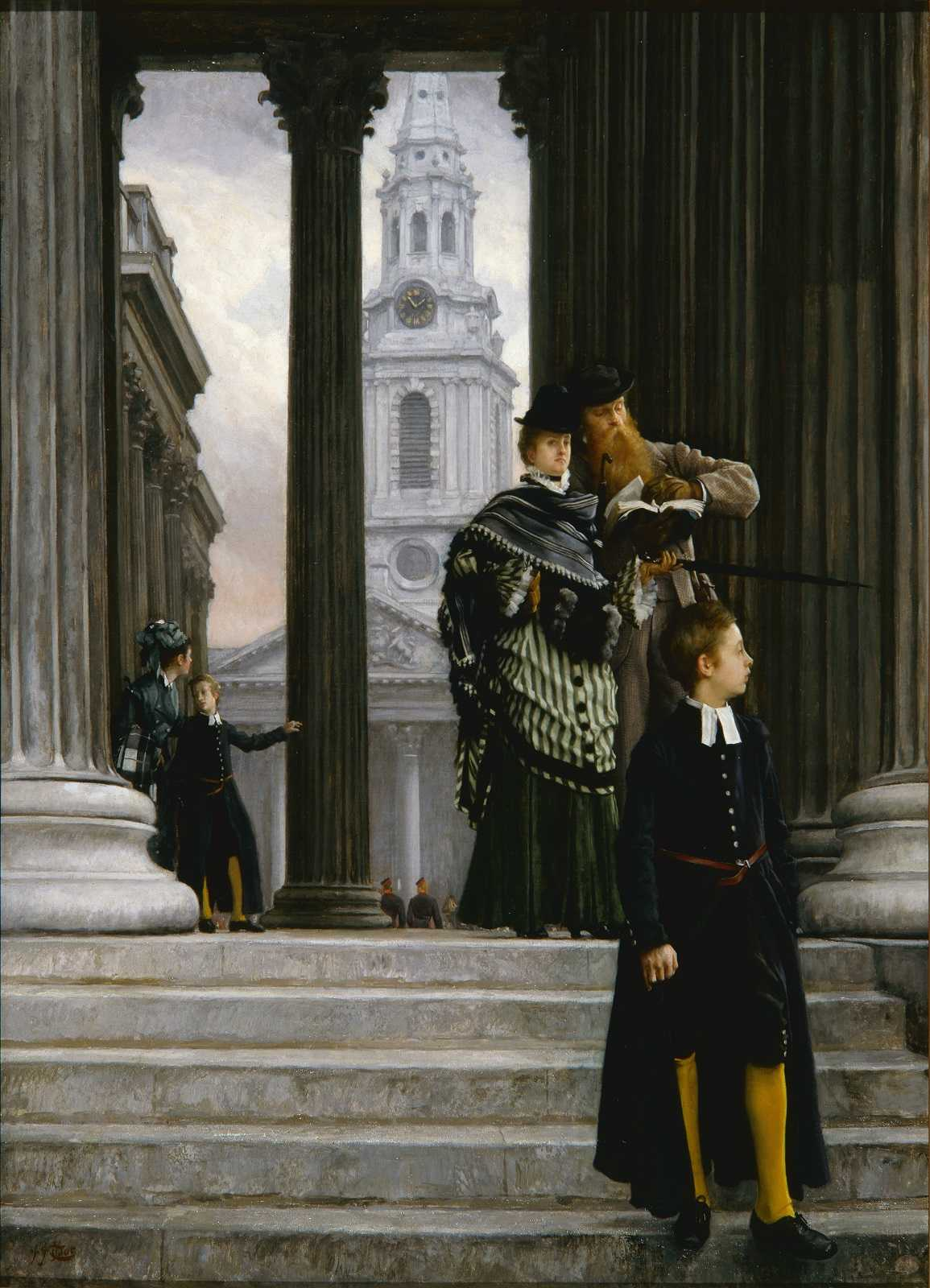
James Tissot, London Visitors, 1874

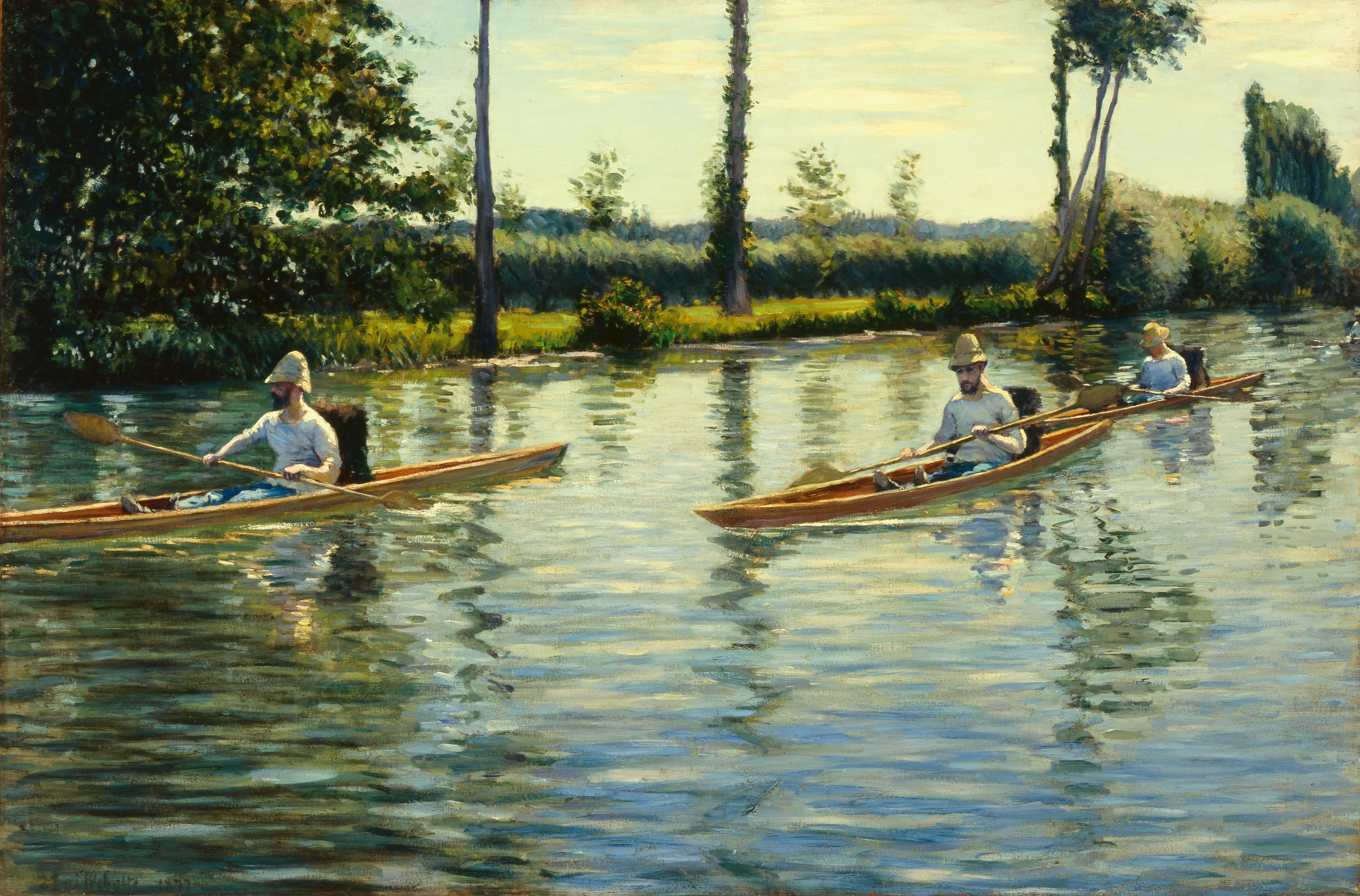
Gustave Caillebotte, Skiffs, 1877

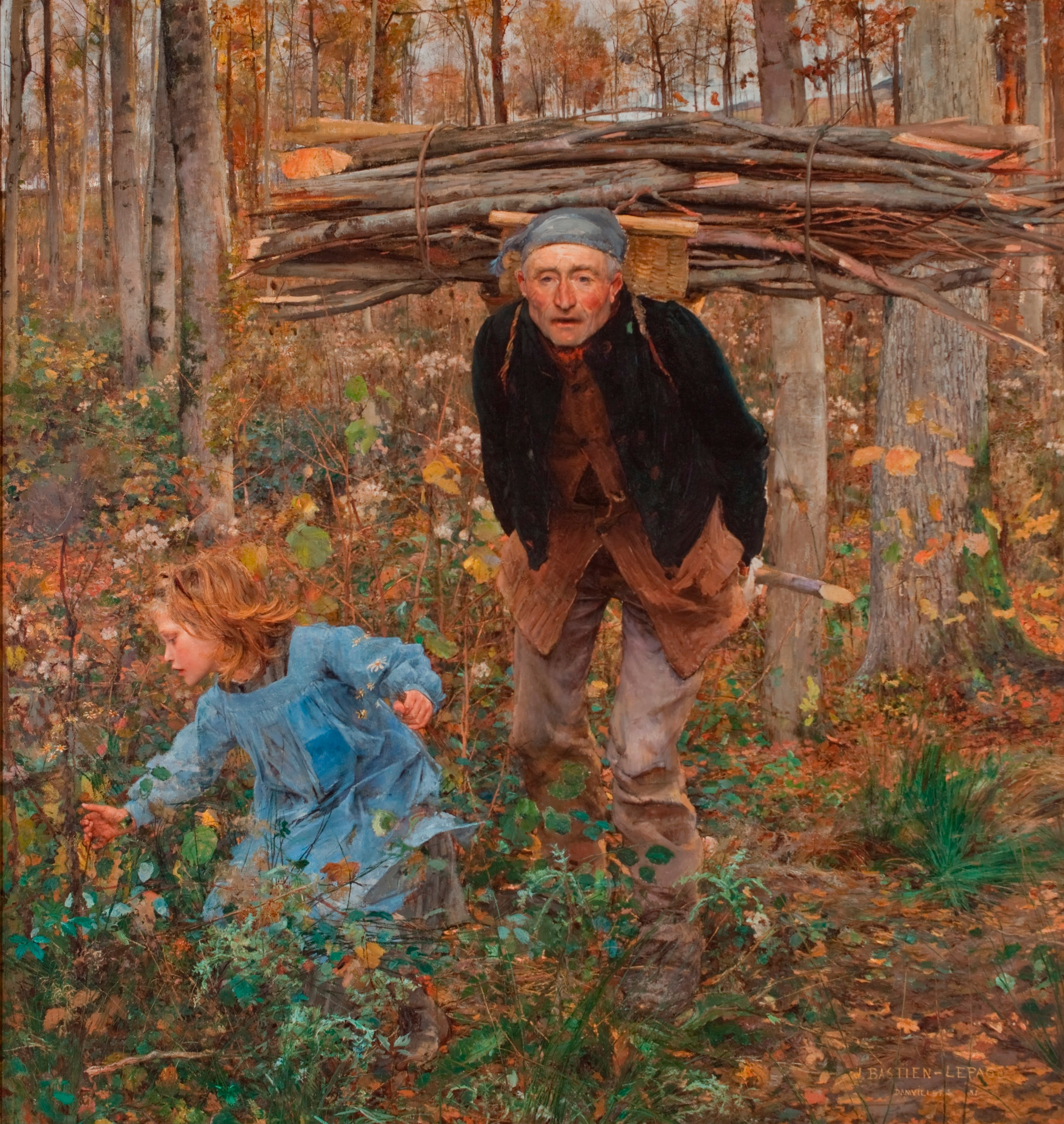
Jules Bastien-Lepage, Le Père Jacques (The Wood Gatherer), 1881

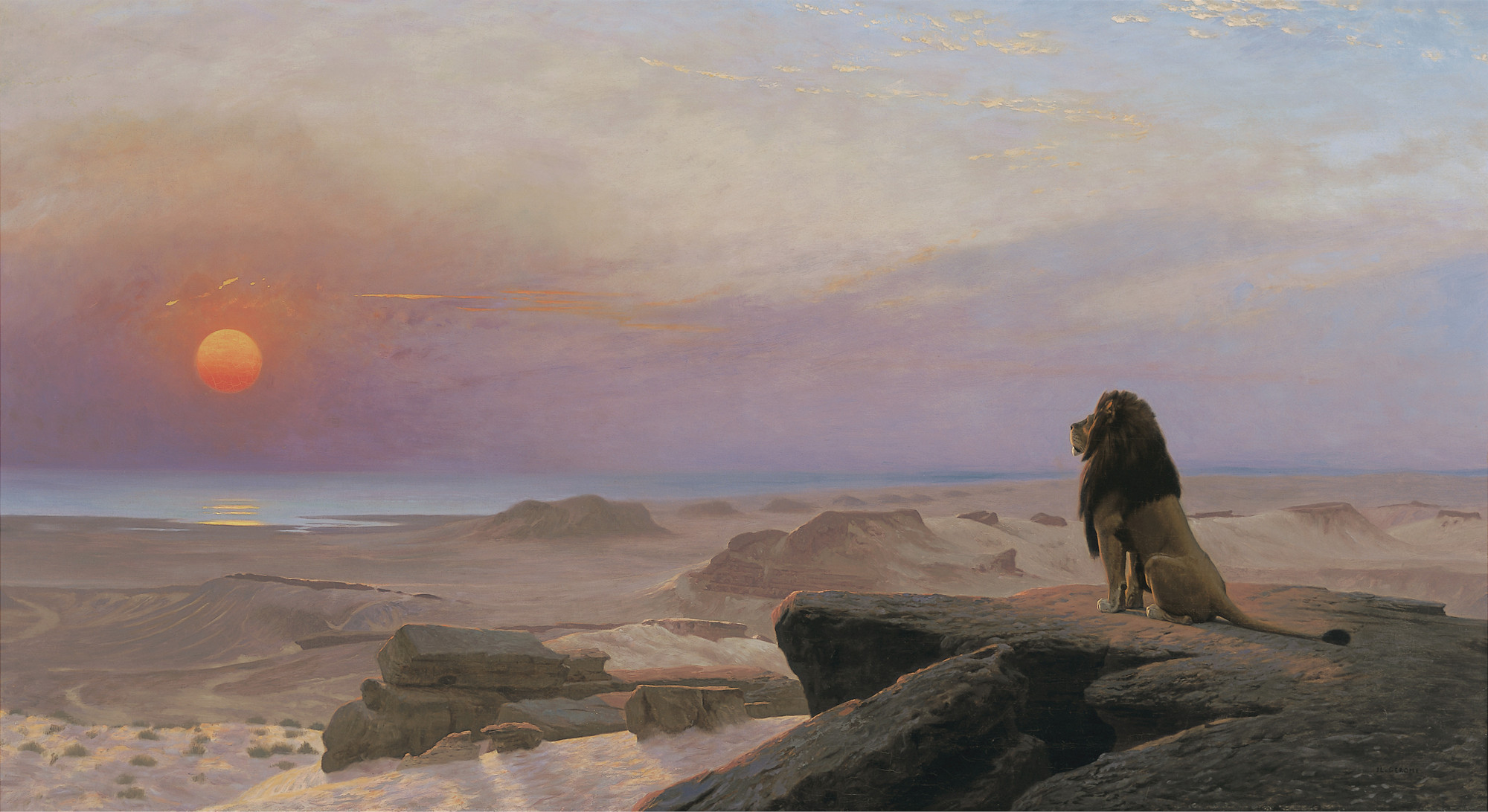
Jean-Léon Gérôme, The Two Majesties, 1883

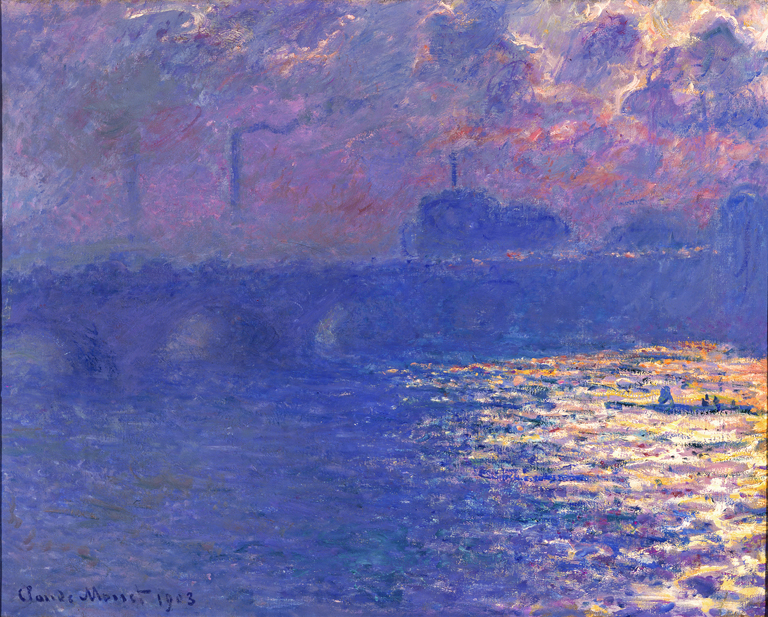
Claude Monet, Waterloo Bridge, c. 1900 (dated 1903)

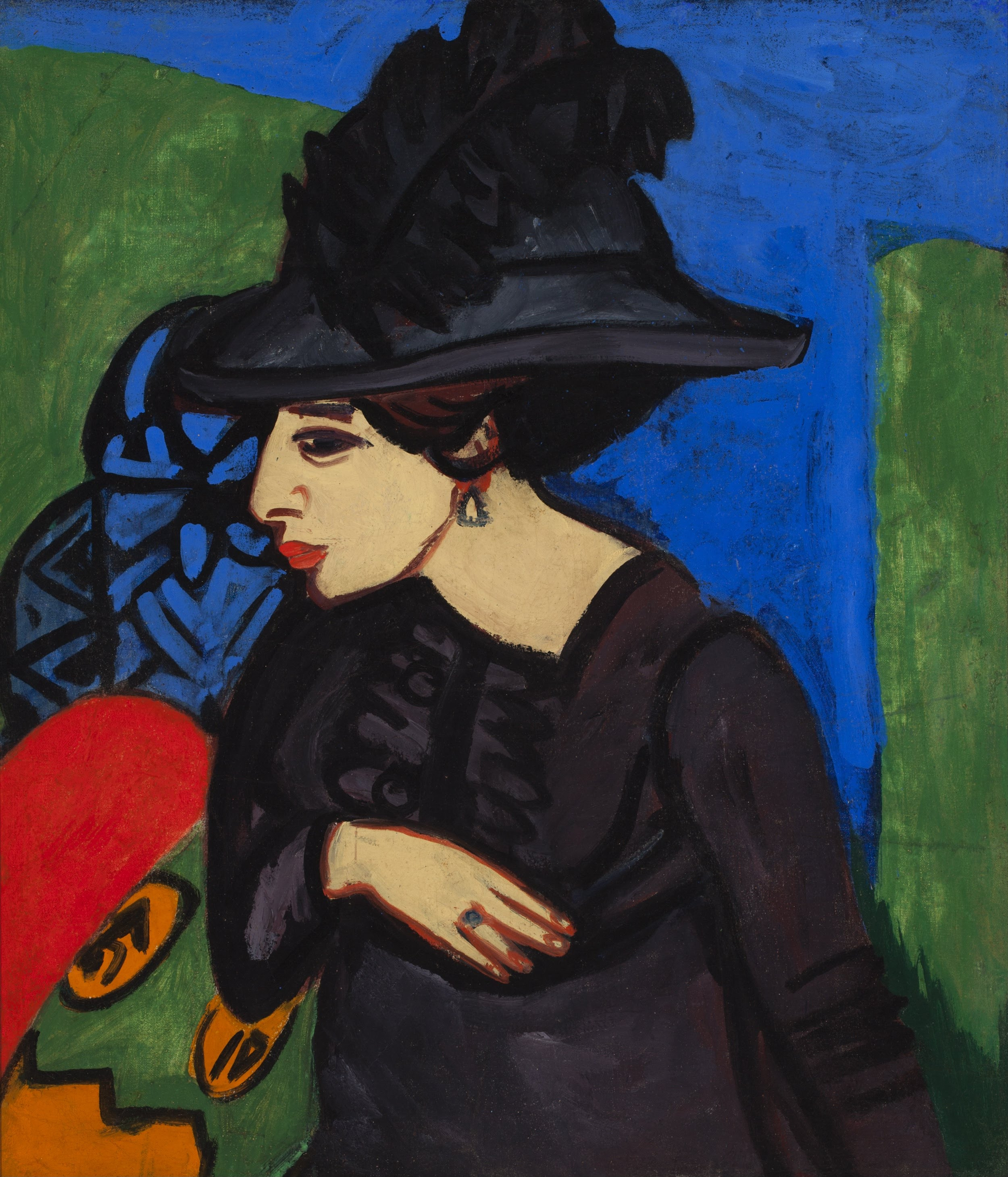
Ernst Ludwig Kirchner, Dodo with a Feather Hat (Dodo mit Federhut), 1911

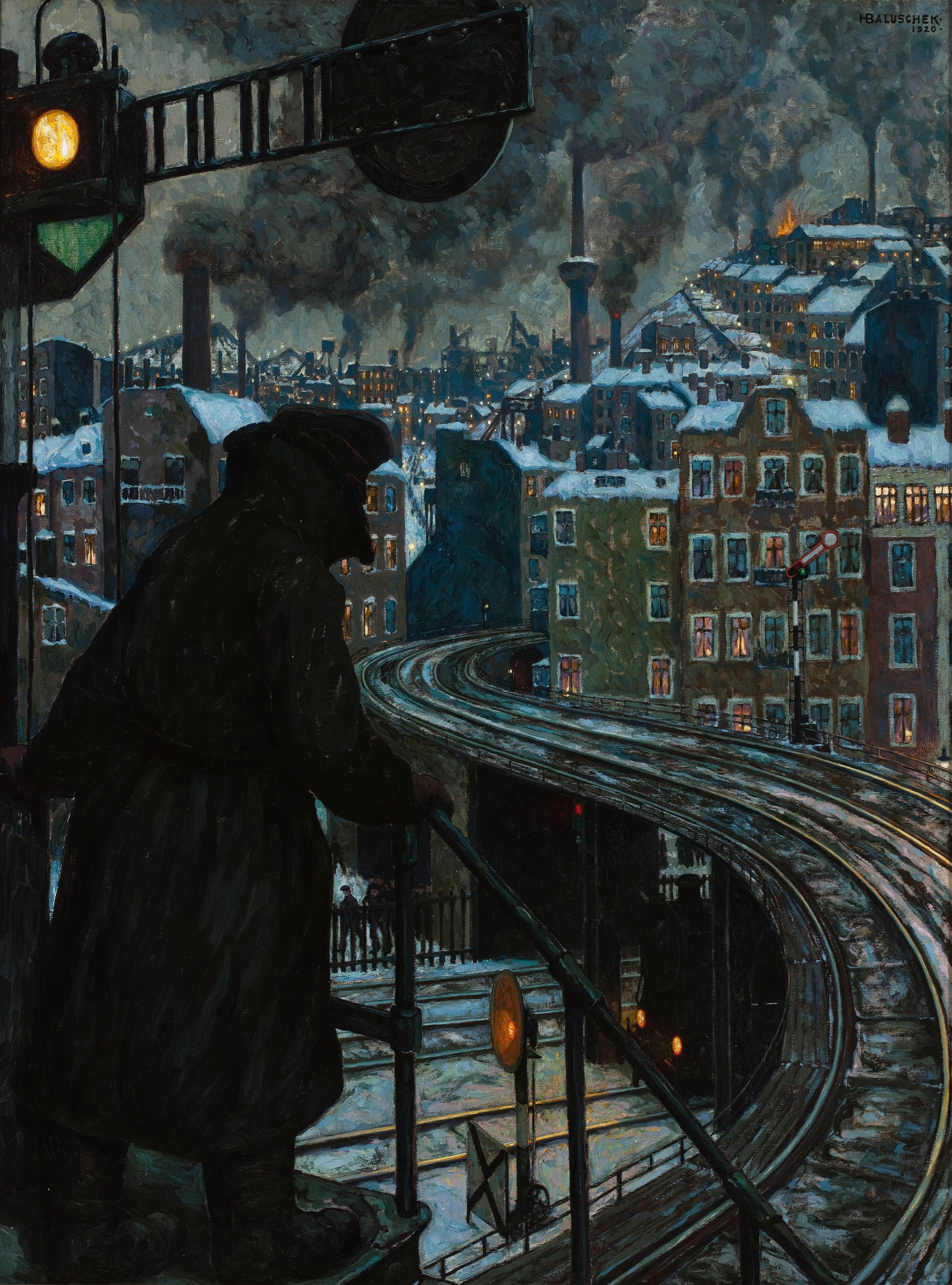
Hans Baluschek, City of Workers (or Working-Class City), 1920

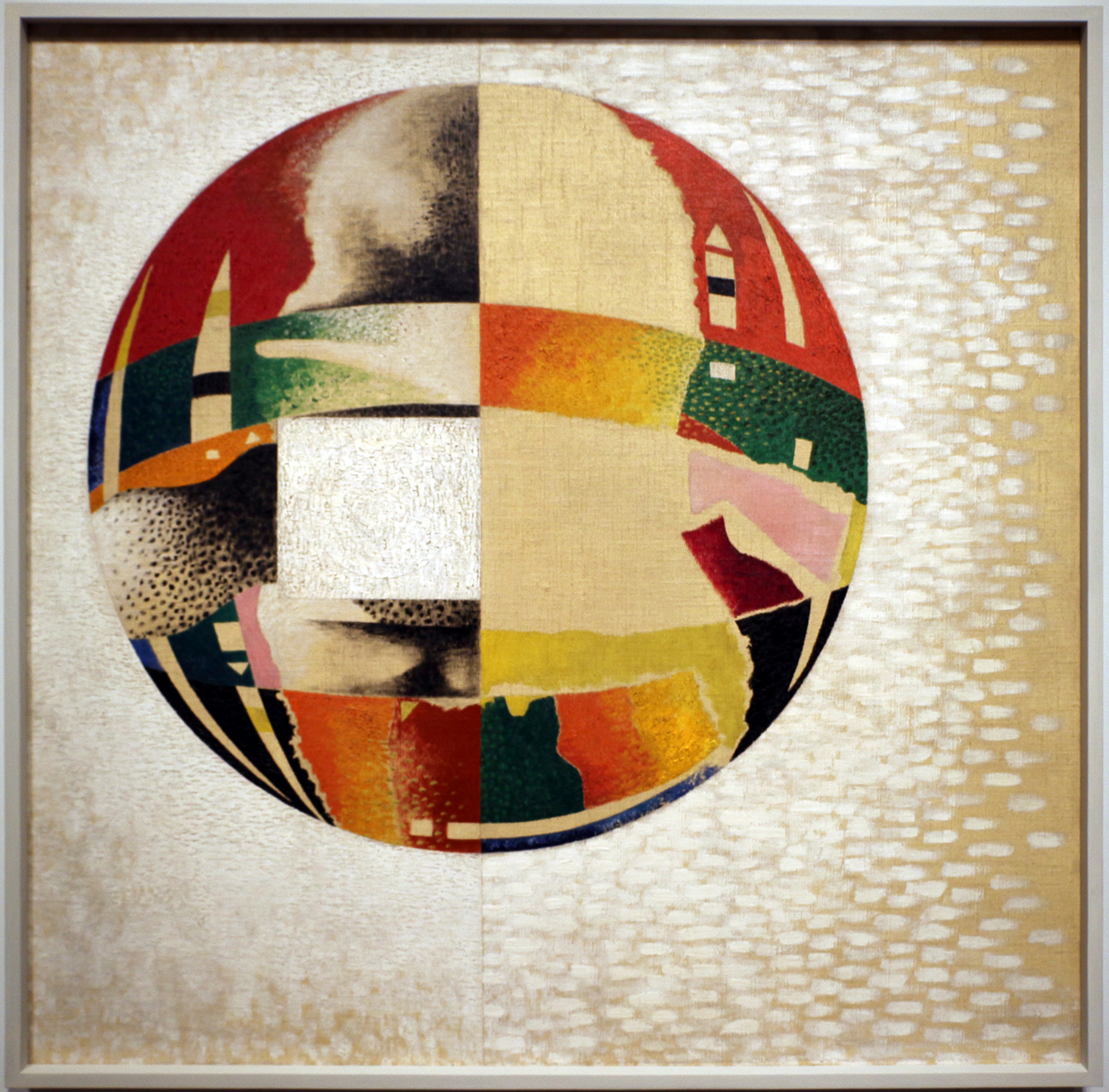
László Moholy-Nagy, Nuclear II, 1946

=== American paintings ===
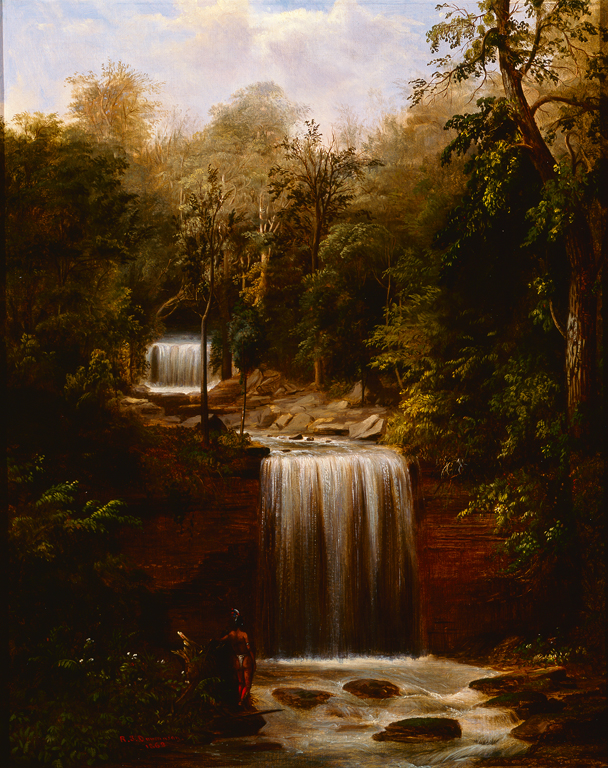
Robert S. Duncanson, Minneopa Falls, 1862

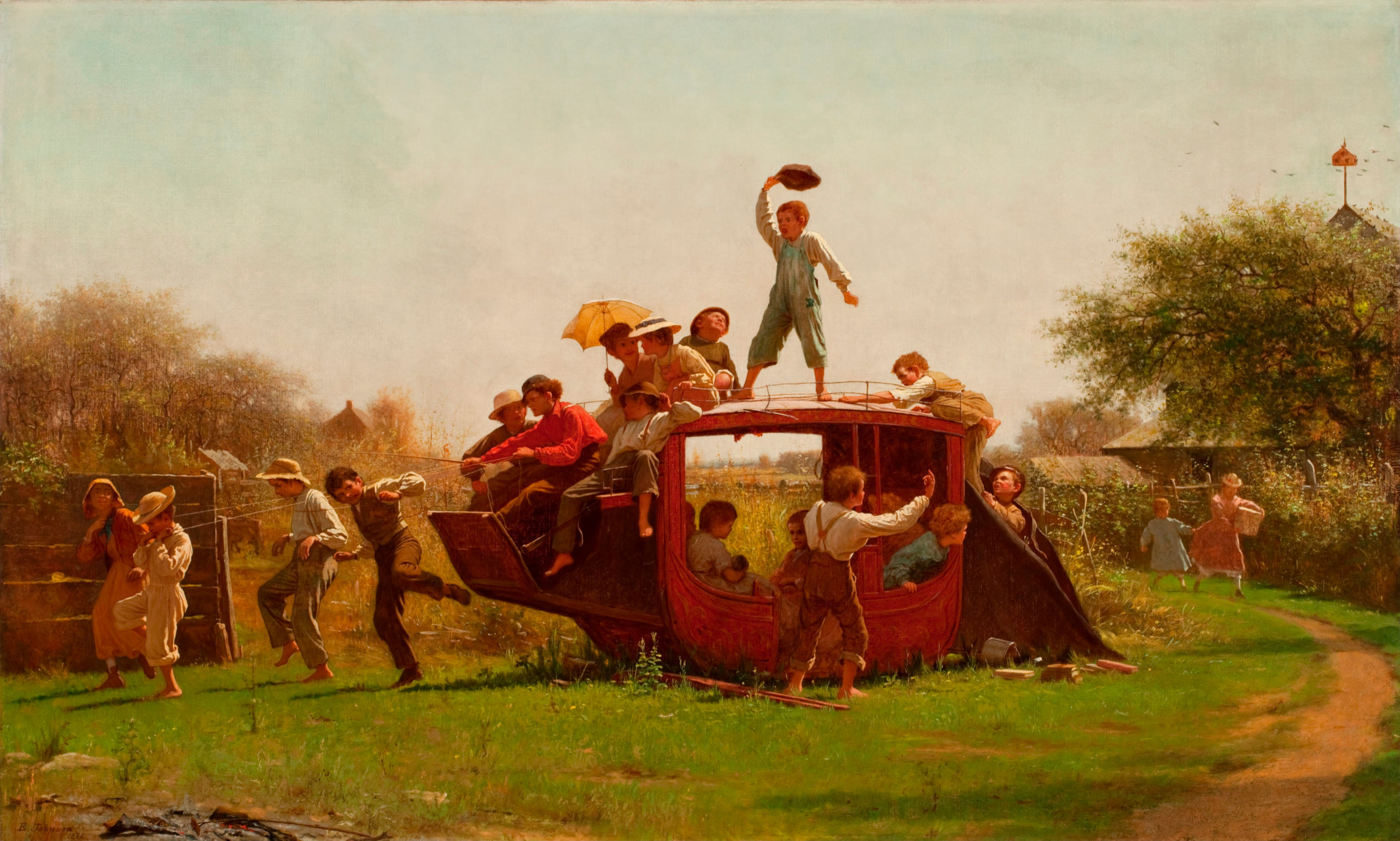
Eastman Johnson, The Old Stagecoach, 1871

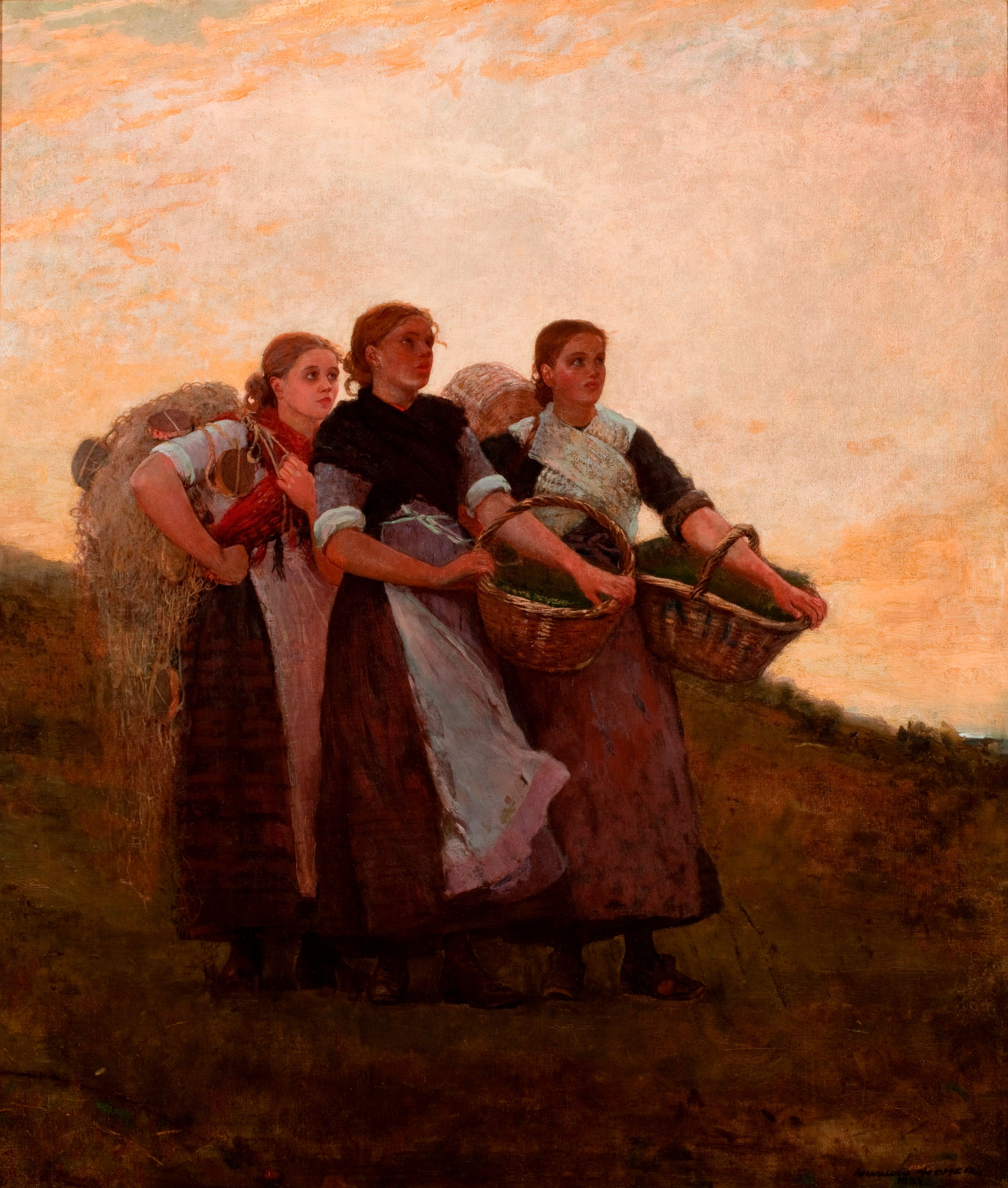
Winslow Homer, Hark! The Lark, 1882

George Inness, Sunset in Georgia, 1890

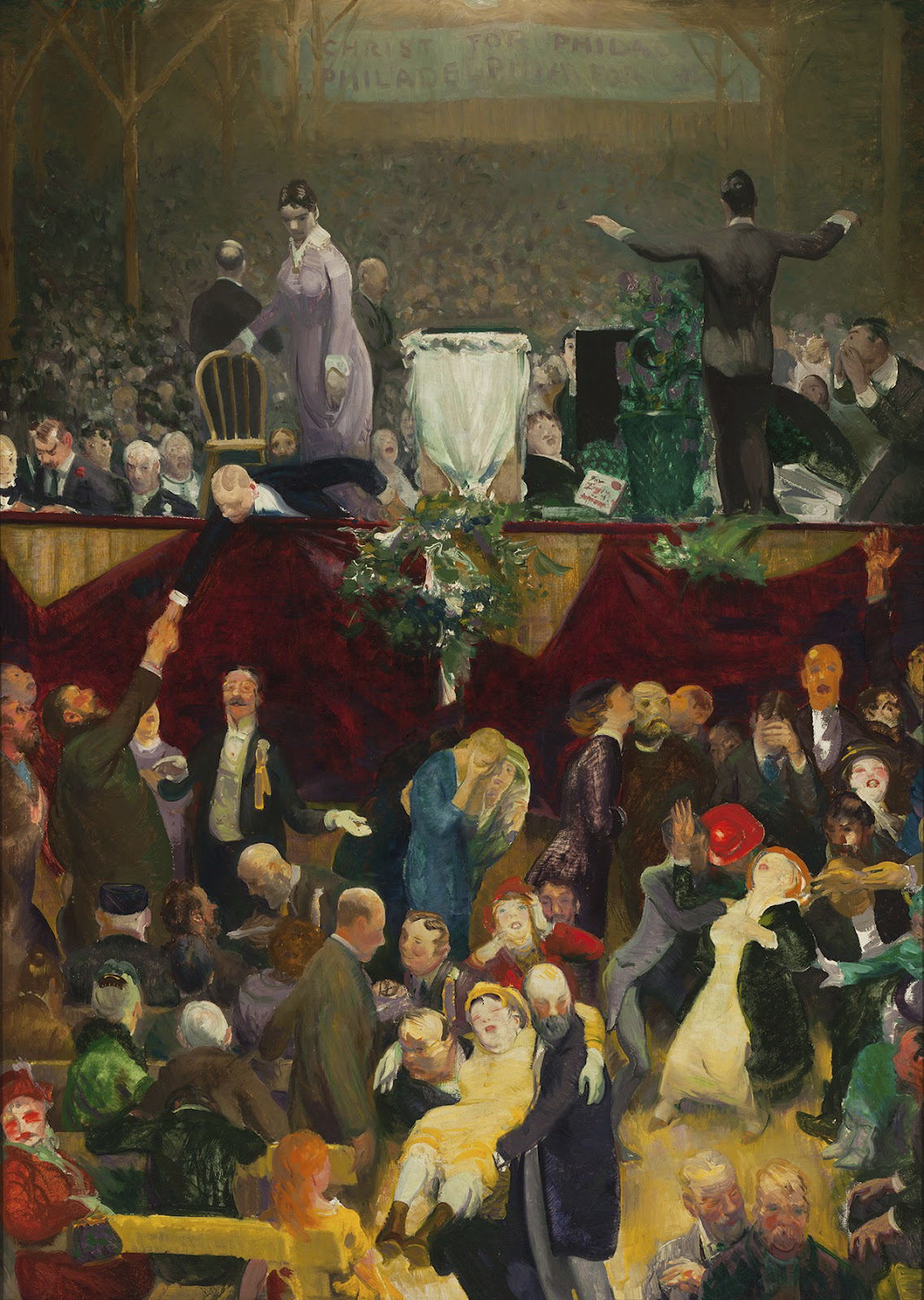
George Bellows, The Sawdust Trail, 1916

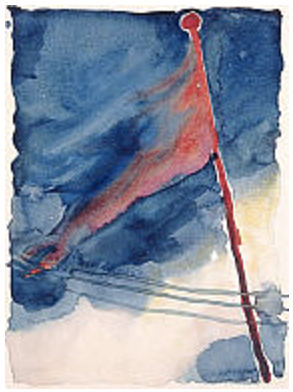
Georgia O'Keeffe, The Flag, 1918

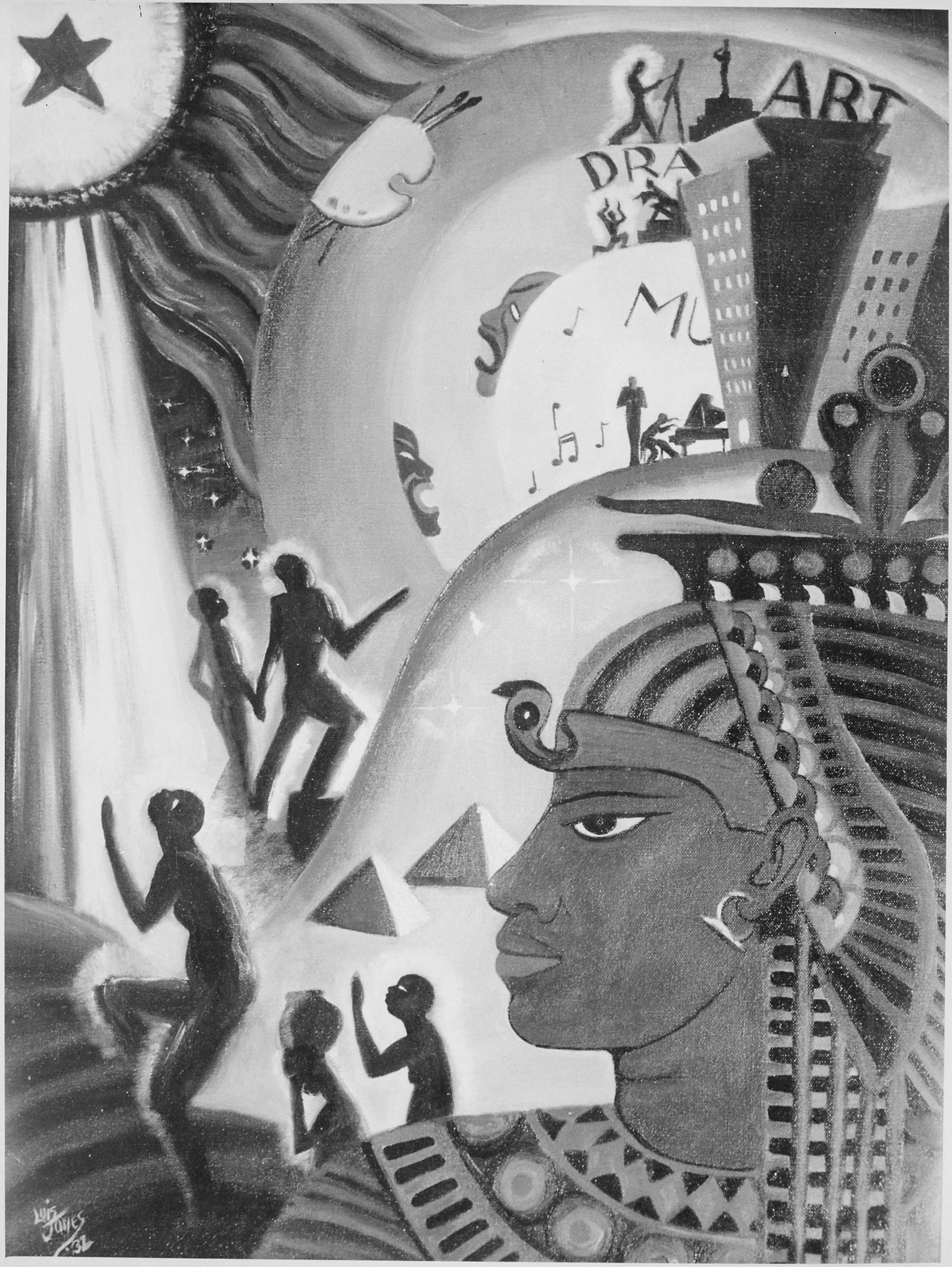
Lois Mailou Jones, The Ascent of Ethiopia, 1932

Andy Warhol, Campbell's Soup Cans, 1965

=== Sculpture ===
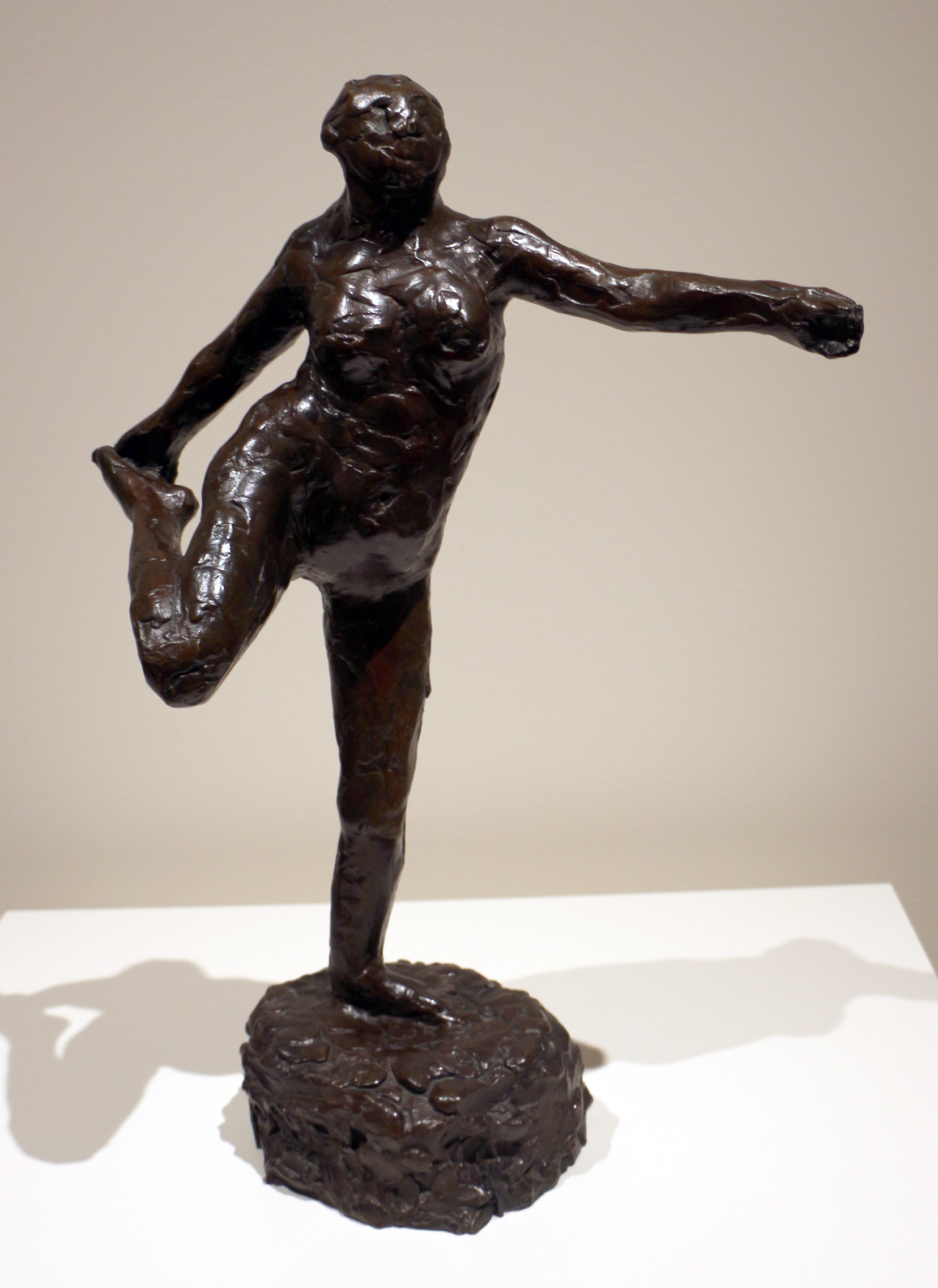
Edgar Degas, Dancer Holding Her Right Foot in Her Right Hand, c. 1904 (cast 1919–20)

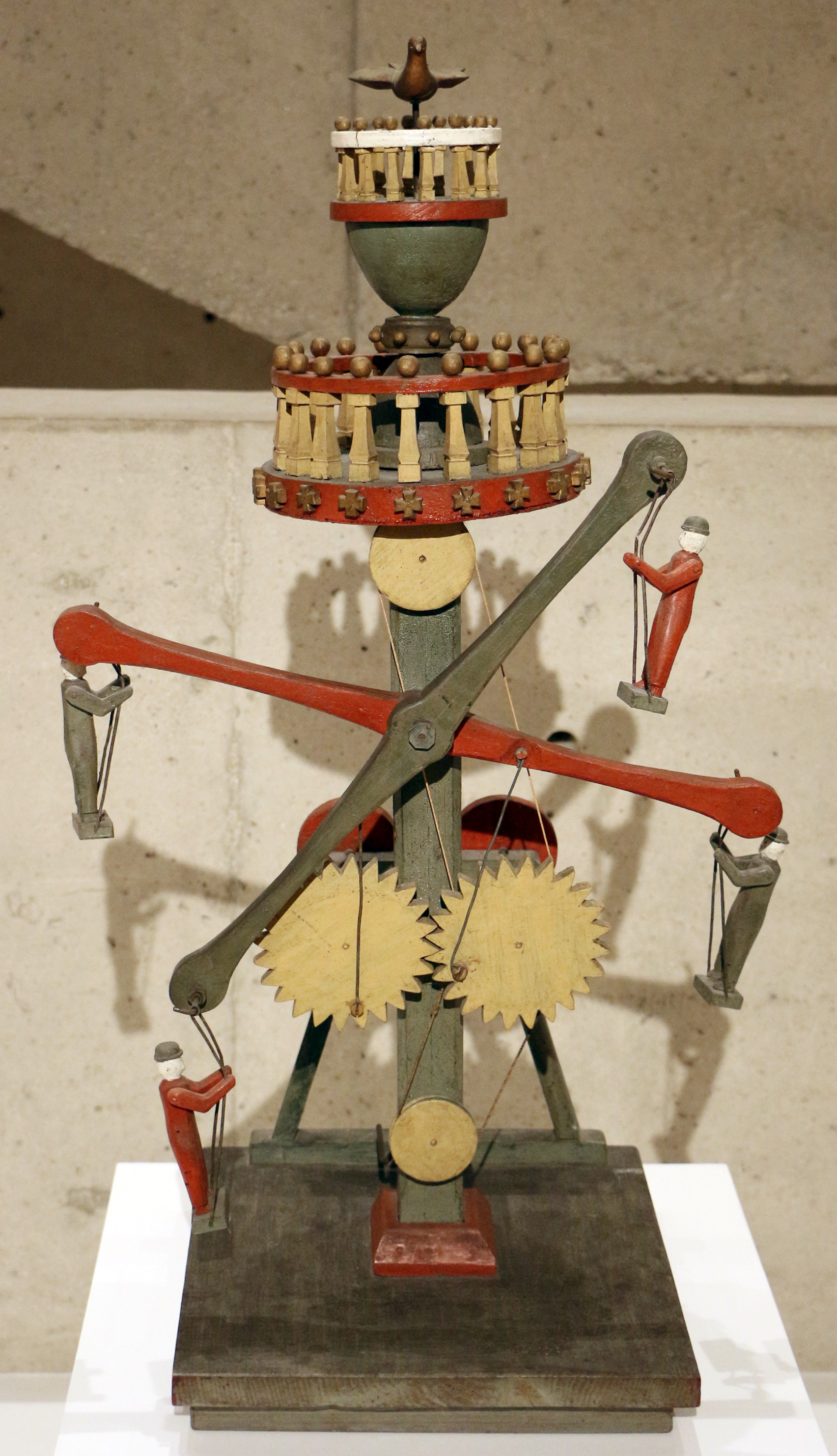
John Scholl, Acrobats, c. 1910

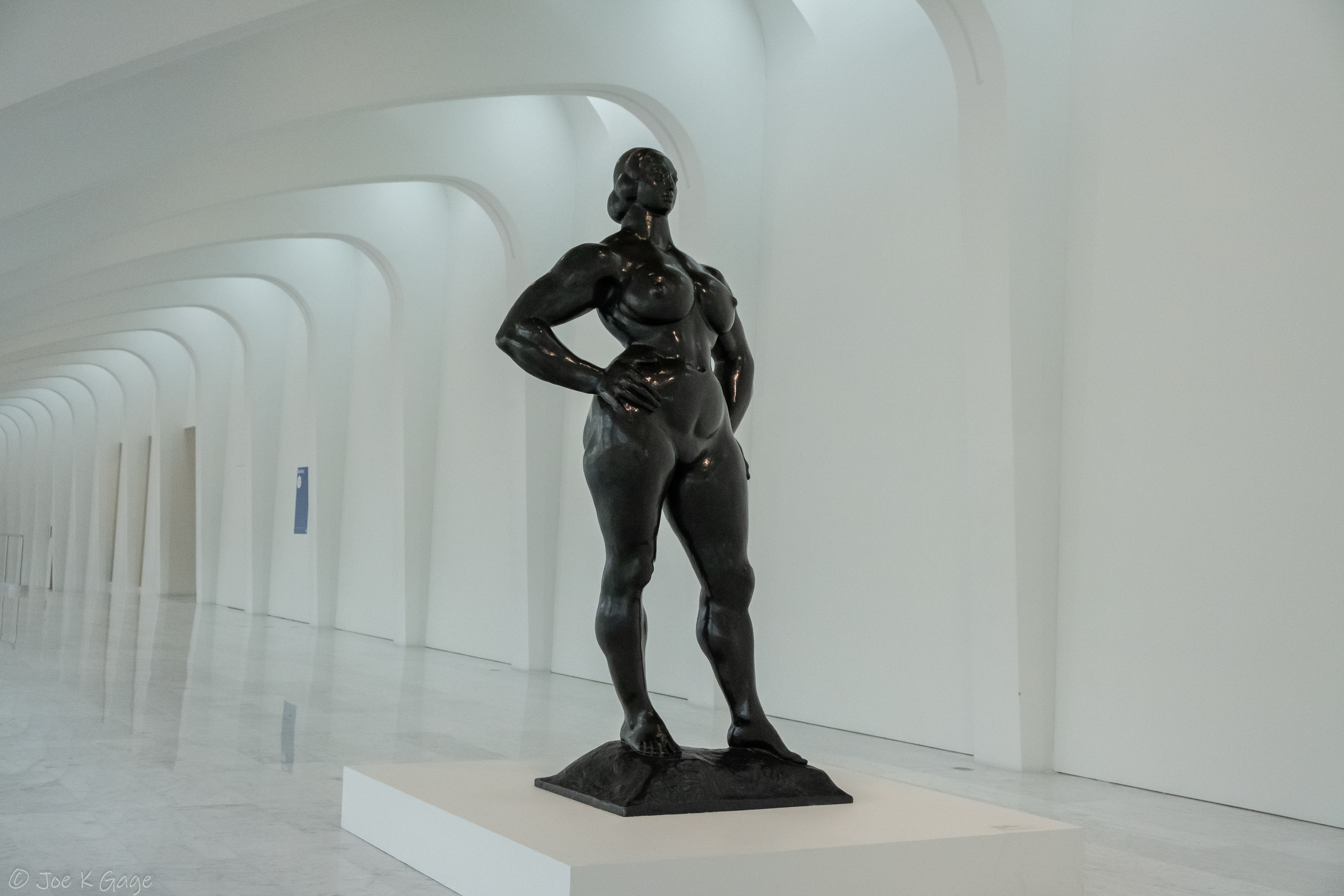
Gaston Lachaise, Standing Woman, 1932 (cast 1980)

=== Furniture and decorative arts ===
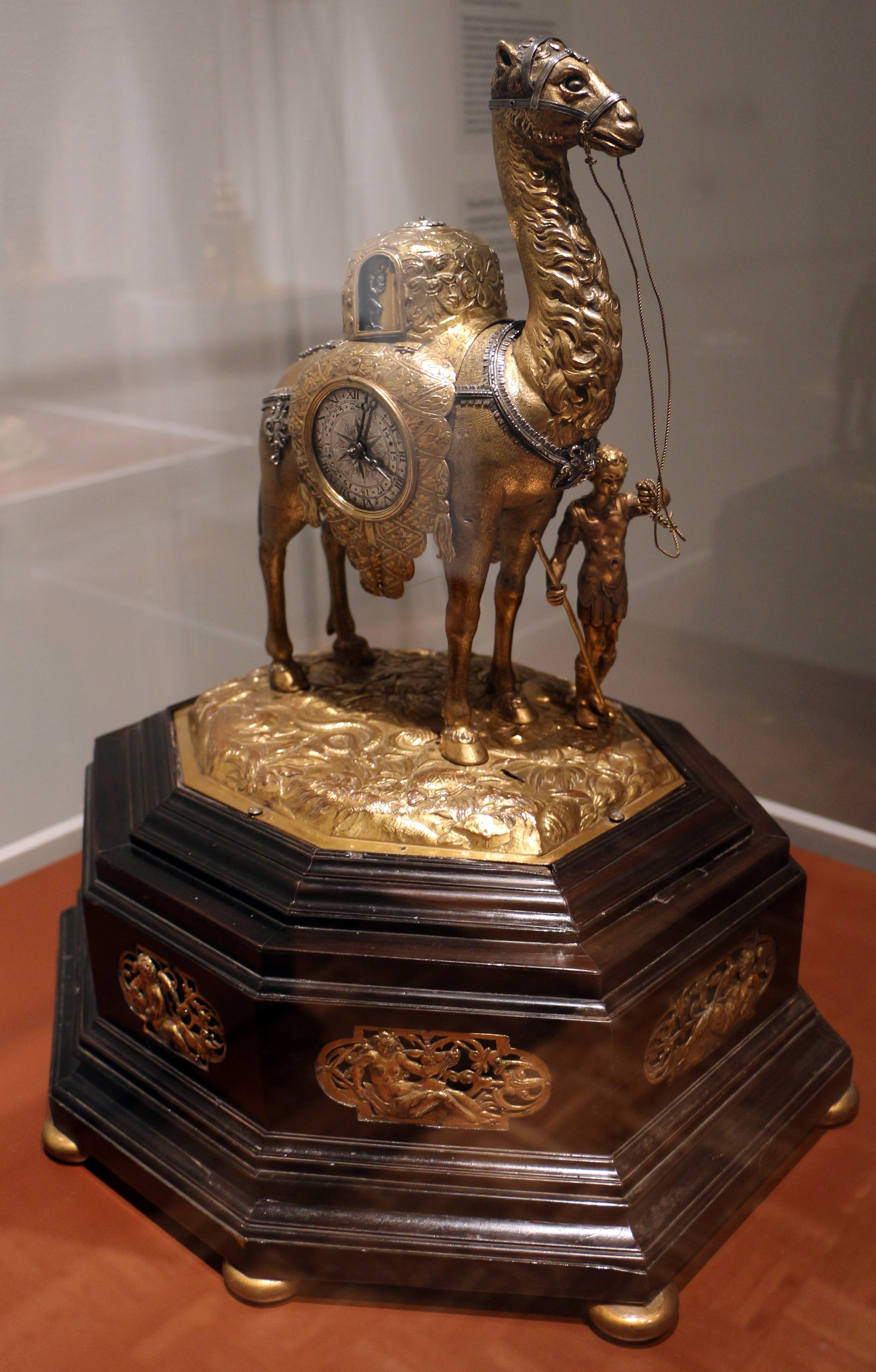
Southern Germany, Automated Clock in the Form of a Dromedary, early 17th century

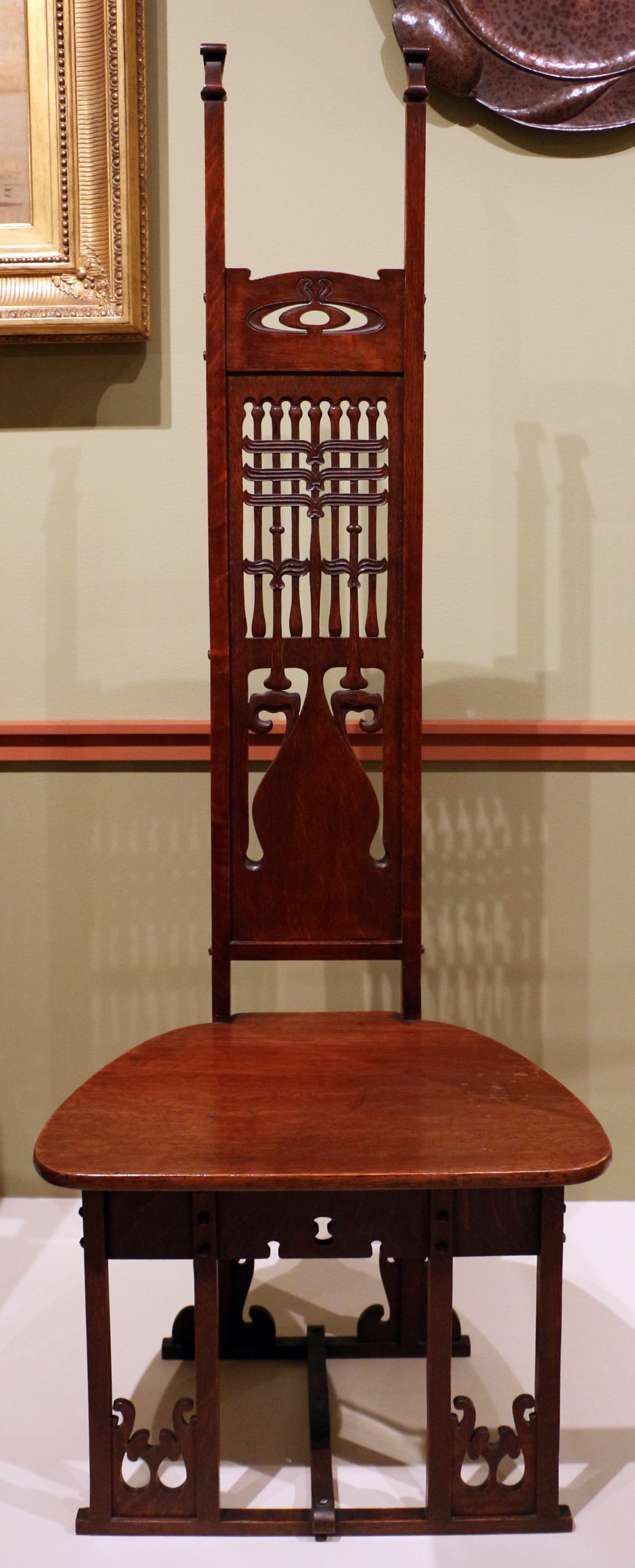
Charles Rohlfs, Hall Chair, 1904

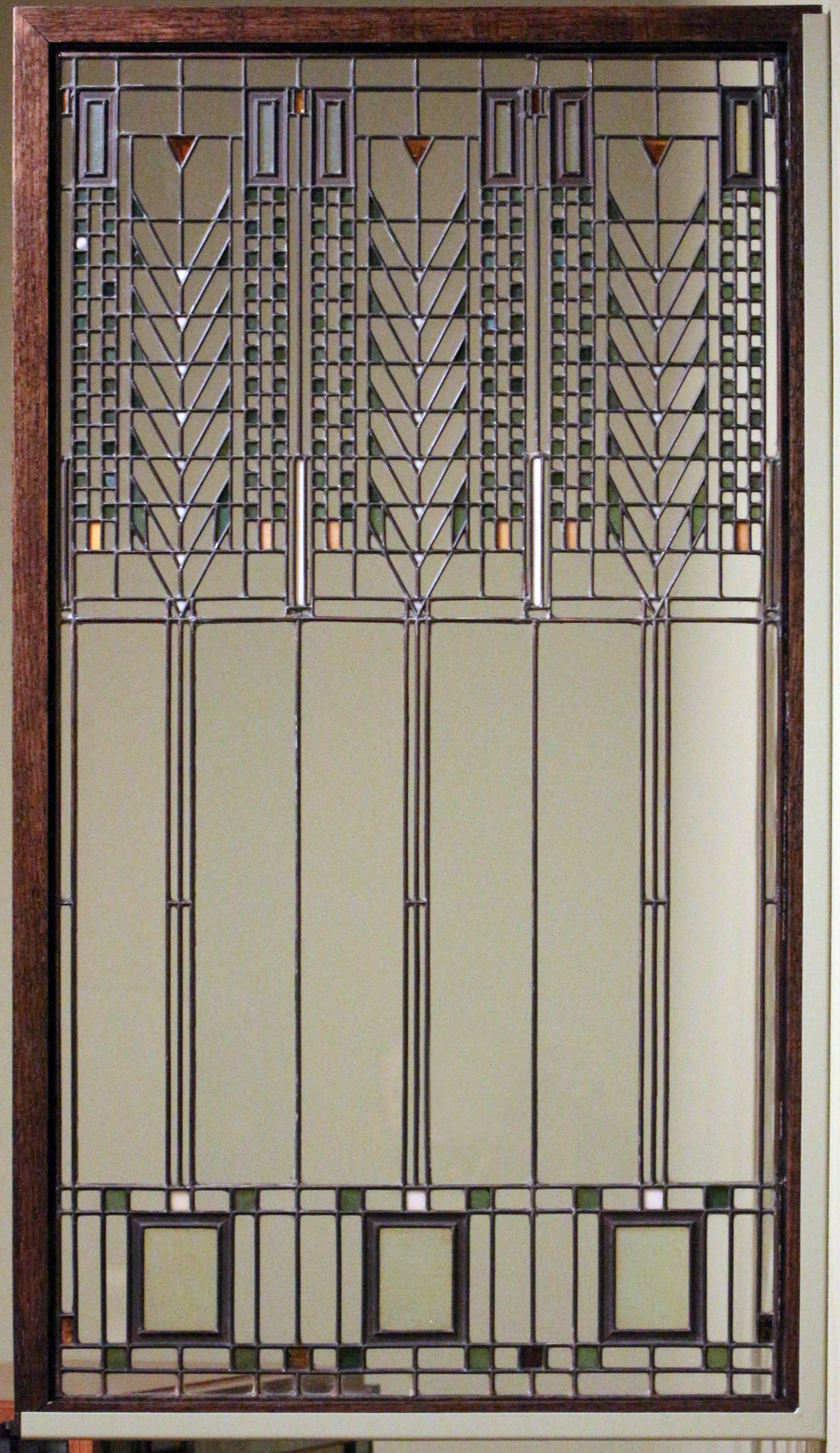
Frank Lloyd Wright, Tree of Life window, from the Darwin D. Martin House, Buffalo, New York, 1904

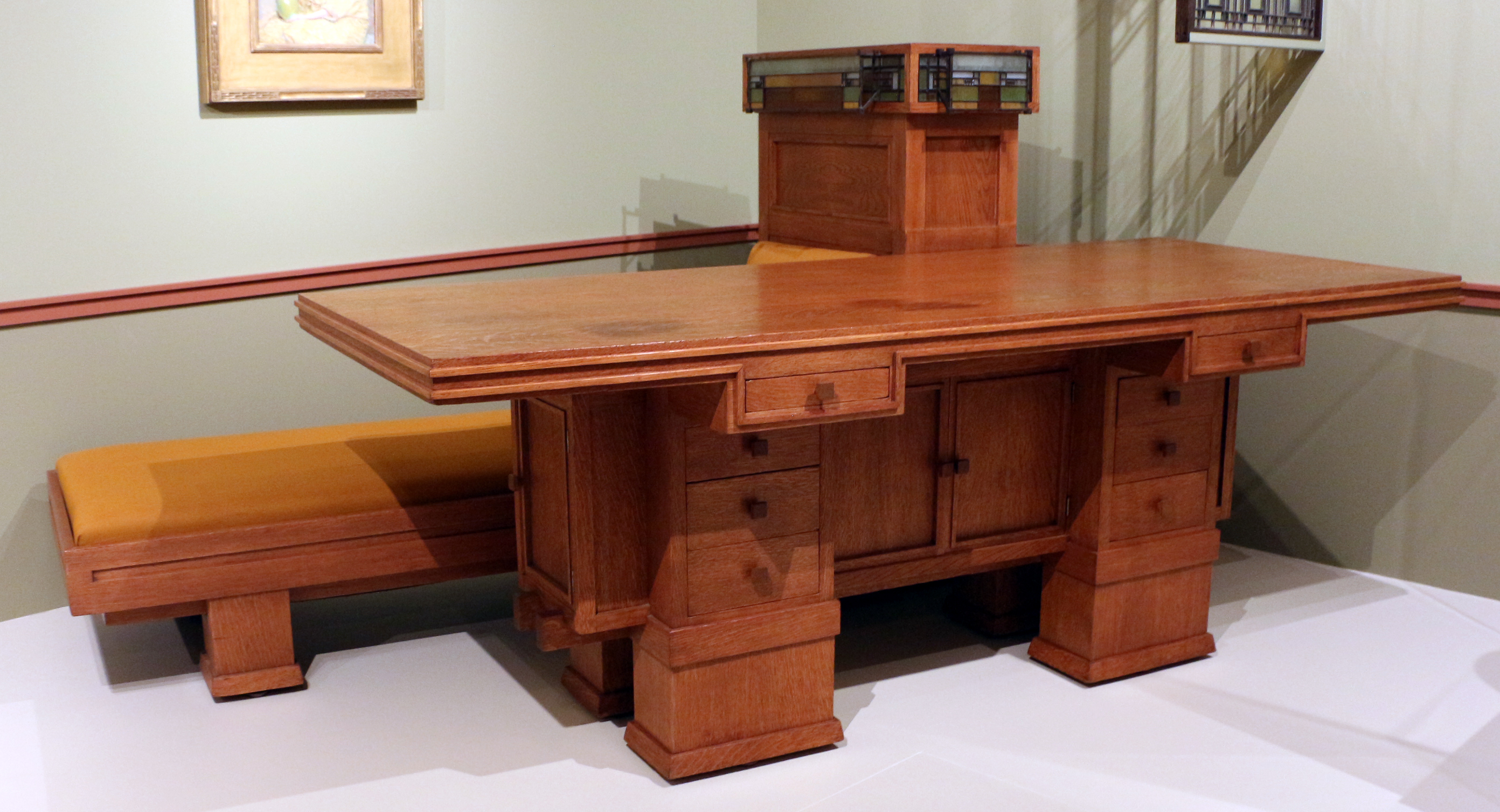
George Mann Niedecken, Combination Writing Desk, Daybed, and Lamp, from the Edward P. Irving Residence, Decatur, Illinois, 1910–11

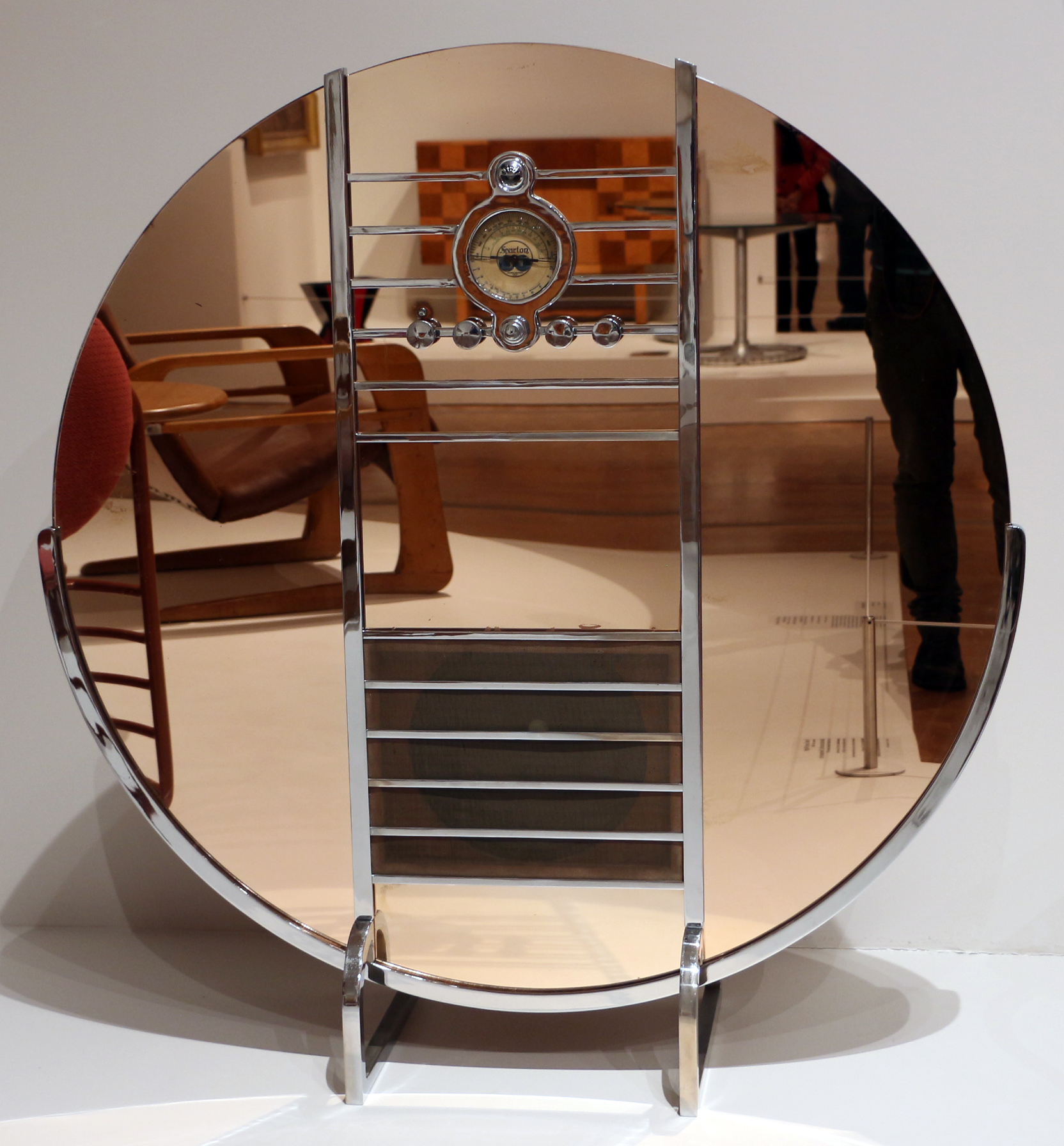
Walter Dorwin Teague, Nocturne Radio (Model #1196), c. 1935

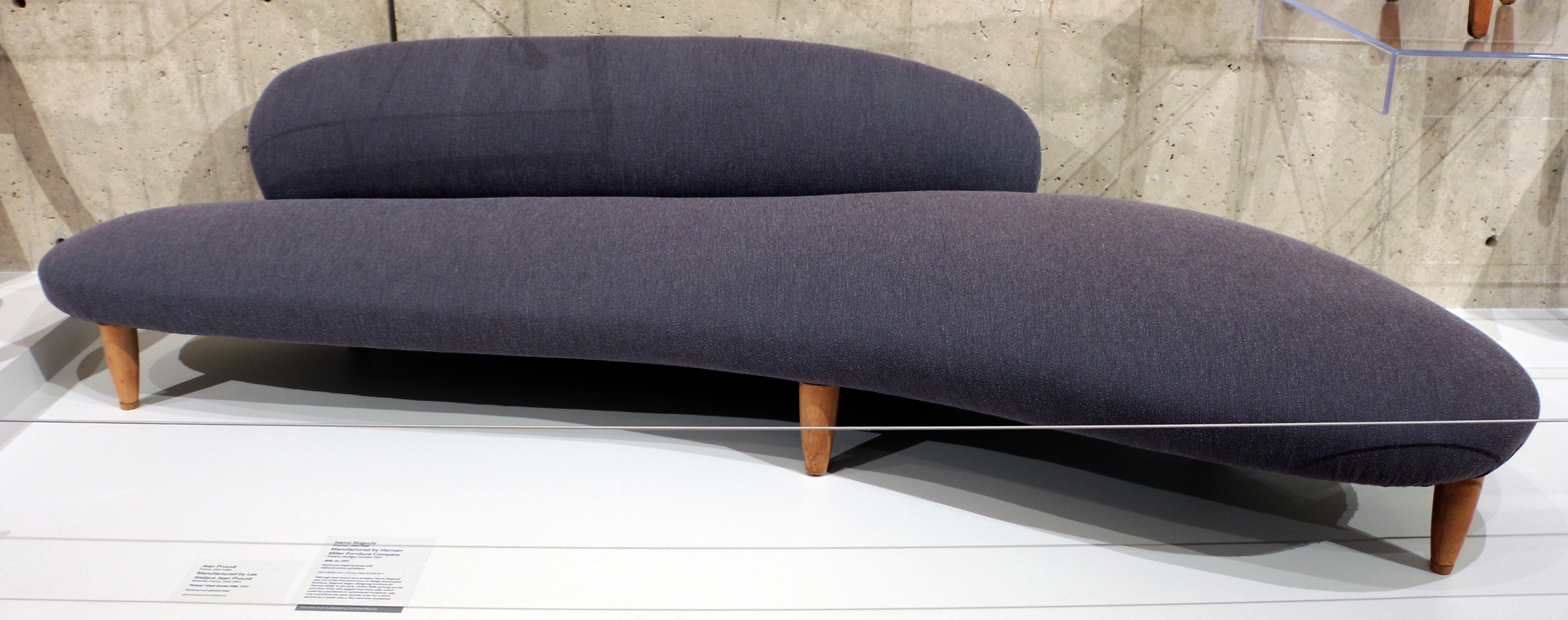
Isamu Noguchi, Sofa, c. 1950

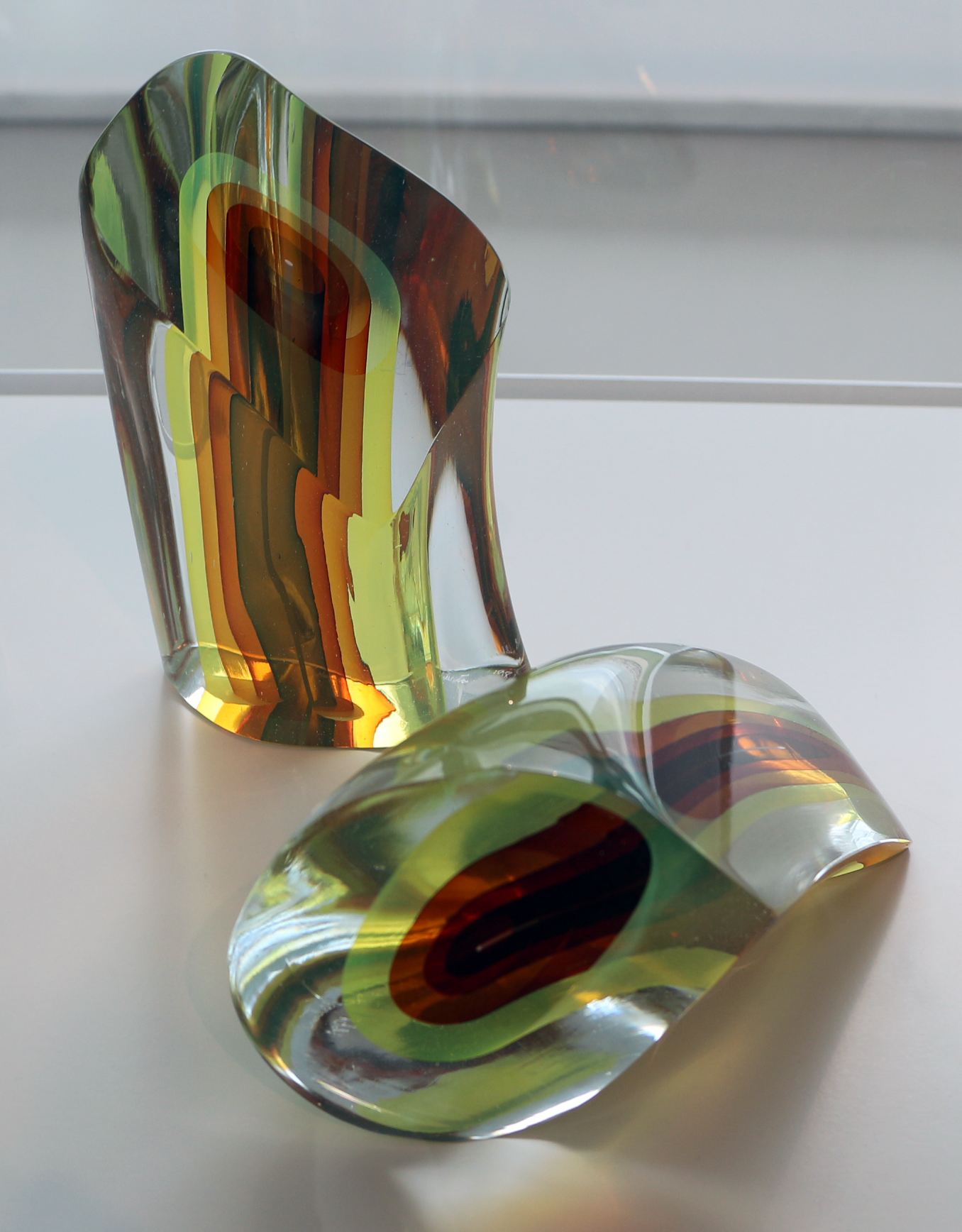
Harvey Littleton, Yellow Curvilinear Sections, 1981

== Governance ==
=== Management ===
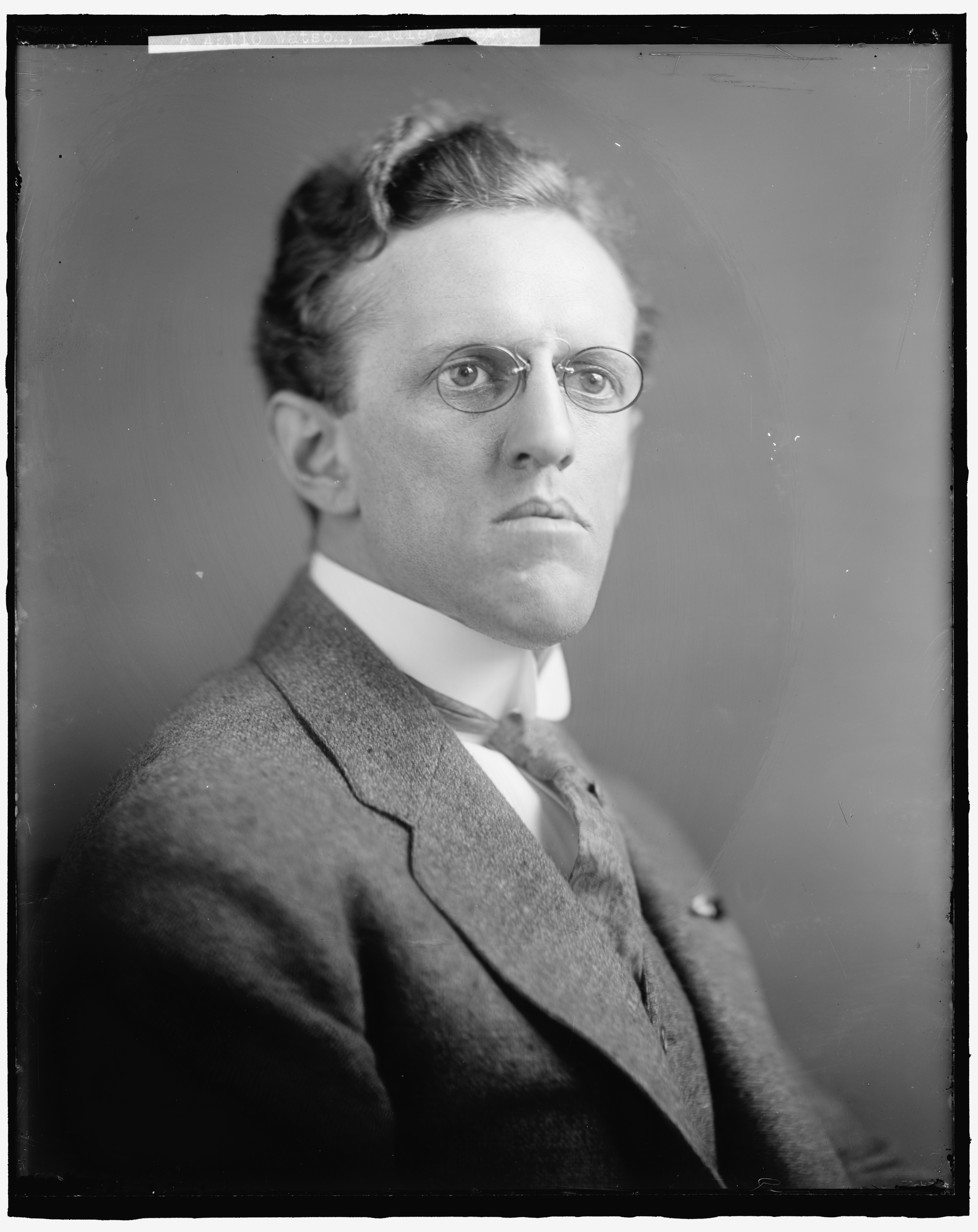
Dudley Crafts Watson, director of the Milwaukee Art Institute 1913–1924

Layton Art Gallery directors (1888–1955)^{α}

- 1888–1919: Frederick Layton (as president)
- 1919–1922: James K. Ilsley (as president)
- 1922–1954: Charlotte Partridge
- 1954–1955: Edmund Lewandowski

Milwaukee Art Institute directors (1888–1955)^{β}

- 1888–1901: Christian Wahl (as president)
- 1910–1911: Charles Allis (as president)
- 1911–1913: Samuel O. Buckner (as president)
- 1913–1924: Dudley Crafts Watson
- 1924–1926: John Ellingwood Donnell Trask
- 1926–1942: Alfred Pelikan
- 1942–1951: George Burton Cumming
- 1951–1955: La Vera Pohl

Milwaukee Art Museum directors (since 1955)^{γ}

- 1955–1962: Edward H. Dwight
- 1962–1977: Charles Tracy Atkinson
- 1977–1985: Gerald Nordland
- 1985–2002: Russell Bowman
- 2002–2008: David Gordon
- 2008–2016: Daniel Keegan
- 2016–2025: Marcelle Polednik
- since 2025: Kim Sajet

=== Funding ===
As of 2015, the museum's endowment is around $65 million. Endowment proceeds cover a fraction of the museum's expenses, leaving it overly dependent on funds from day-to-day operations such as ticket sales. Daniel Keegan, who served as the museum's director from 2008 to 2016, negotiated an agreement with Milwaukee County and the Milwaukee County War Memorial for the long-term management and funding of the facilities in 2013. In 2024, a $3.54 million gift helped establish an endowment to make admission to the museum free for children aged 12 and under.

== Controversy ==
In June 2015 the museum's display of a work depicting Pope Benedict XVI, composed of 17,000 latex condoms, created outrage among Catholics and others.

== In popular culture ==
The Quadracci Pavilion makes an appearance in the 2008 EA racing video game Need for Speed: Undercover, as well as the film Transformers: Dark of the Moon, where it stands for the headquarters of car collector Dylan Gould (played by actor Patrick Dempsey).

== See also ==
- List of largest art museums
- List of museums in Wisconsin
- List of public art in Milwaukee, including sculpture belonging to the museum's collections

== Notes ==
^α The gallery was led by a president before a distinct director position was created in 1922.
^β The list includes time periods when the Institute was known as the Milwaukee Art Association (1888–1910) and the Milwaukee Art Society (1910–1916). The association and succeeding society were led by a president before a distinct director position was created in 1913.
^γ The list includes the time period when the museum was known as the Milwaukee Art Center (1955–1980).
