= The Two Majesties (painting) =

1883 painting by Jean-Léon Gérôme

- Les Deux Majestés (French)
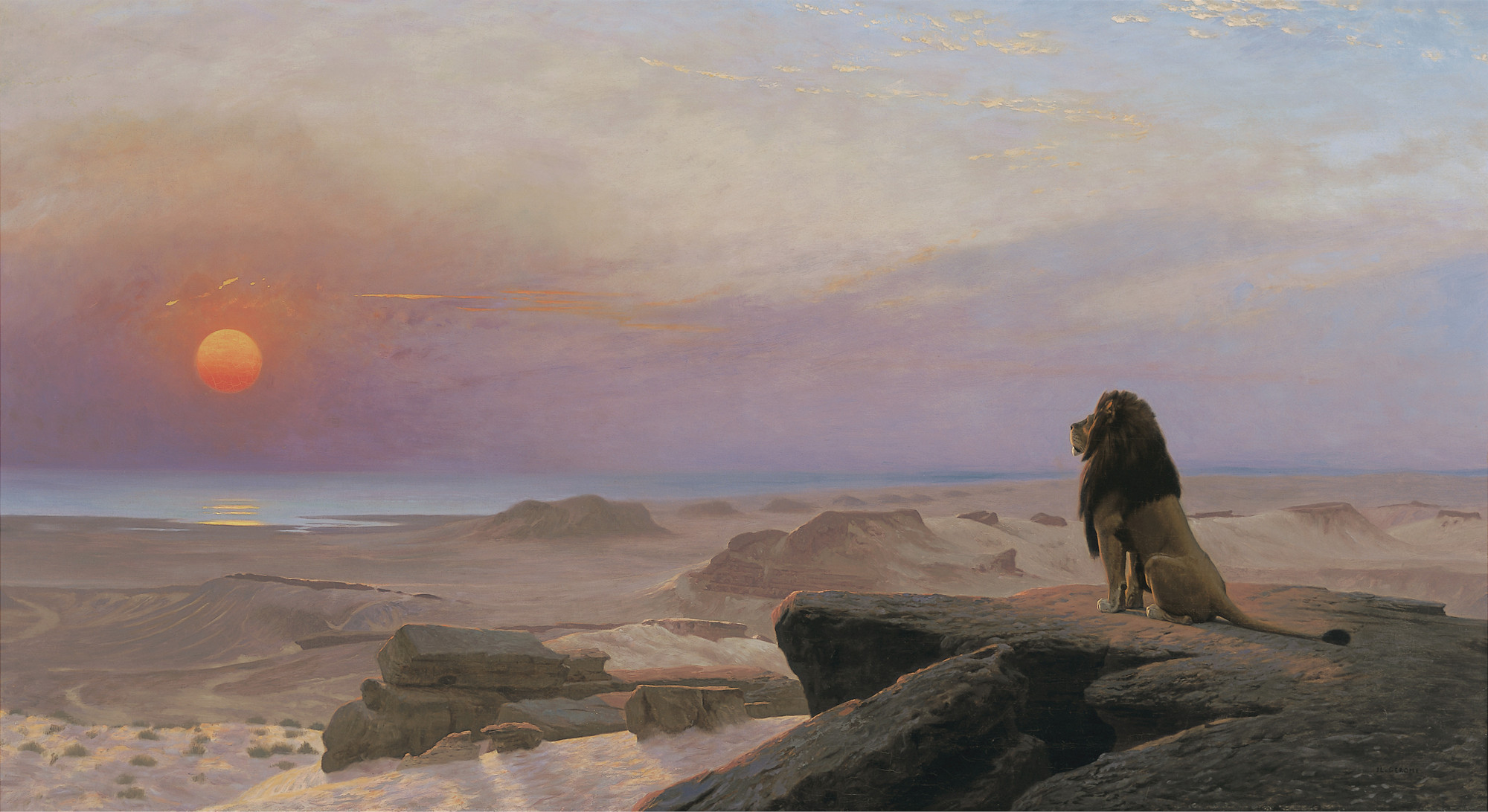
- Artist: Jean-Léon Gérôme
- Year: 1883
- Medium: Oil on canvas
- Dimensions: 69.2 cm × 128.9 cm (27 1/4 in × 50 3/4 in)
- Location: Milwaukee Art Museum, Milwaukee

The Two Majesties (French: Les Deux Majestés) is an 1883 oil on canvas by the French academic painter Jean-Léon Gérôme, now in the collection of the Milwaukee Art Museum.

The painting depicts a lion, king of beasts, sitting on a rocky promontory overlooking the desert, facing the setting sun. Orientalist in style, the work was inspired by Gérôme's repeated journeys to Egypt and his studies of lions at the Ménagerie du Jardin des plantes in Paris. The painting belongs to a larger body of feline pictures that the artist produced in the 1880s, including The Christian Martyrs' Last Prayer (1883) and The King of the Beasts (c. 1888).

The painting's sparse composition and the lion's reflective pose have encouraged art historians to read the work as a meditation on power, solitude, and humanity's relationship to nature, or even as a veiled identification between an aging Gérôme and the figure of the lion facing mortality (symbolized by the imminent twilight).

The painting was purchased by Milwaukee entrepreneur Edward P. Allis in 1888 and later gifted by his son Louis Allis to the Milwaukee Art Museum in 1968.
