= Alfred Pelikan =

American painter, printmaker and museum director

Alfred George Pelikan
- Born: March 15, 1893; Breslau, Prussia
- Died: December 20, 1987 (aged 94); Fox Point, Wisconsin
- Education: Carnegie Institute of Technology, Teachers College, Columbia University
- Known for: Painting
- Movement: Regionalism, Abstraction

Alfred Pelikan (March 15, 1893 – December 20, 1987) was a German-born American painter, educator and museum director. He was based in Milwaukee, Wisconsin.

== Biography ==
Pelikan was born on March 15, 1893, into a family of circus artists from Breslau, Prussia (now Wrocław, Poland). He was the younger brother of acrobat Lillian Leitzel (born Leopoldina Pelikan, 1892–1931), who performed for the Ringling Bros. and Barnum & Bailey Circus, and with whom he moved to the United States in 1911. Leitzel would later die prematurely of injuries sustained from a fall during one of her performances in 1931.

Pelikan first settled in Grand Rapids, Michigan, before moving to Milwaukee in 1925 in the wake of obtaining a Master's degree from Teachers College, at Columbia University. He led the Milwaukee Art Institute, one of the predecessors to the Milwaukee Art Museum, between 1926 and 1942, while teaching drawing classes. In parallel, Pelikan became director of the visual arts program of the Milwaukee Public Schools.

In 1931, Pelikan published the volume The Art of the Child, in which he exposed his philosophy of art education by analyzing 52 drawings and paintings made by children of various ages. That same year, he served on the jury that selected the designs of painter Francis Scott Bradford for a series of 25 murals in the Milwaukee County Courthouse.

Pelikan occupied his position within the Milwaukee Public Schools system until 1962, while continuing to paint landscapes and abstract compositions. He died in Fox Point, Wisconsin, on December 20, 1987.

== See also ==
- Layton Art Gallery, a concurrent institution to the Milwaukee Art Institute

== Bibliography ==
- Jensen, Dean (2013). Queen of the Air: A True Story of Love and Tragedy at the Circus. New York: Crown Publishers. ISBN 978-0307986566.
