= William L. Hawkins =

American folk artist

William Lawrence Hawkins
- Born: July 27, 1895; Union City, Kentucky
- Died: July 1990

William L. Hawkins (27 July 1895 – 1990) was an American folk artist whose work began receiving acclaim in the 1980s. Hawkins frequently used a variety of media, including discarded materials, to create his paintings.

Hawkins' works have been exhibited in institutions such as the Smithsonian American Art Museum, American Folk Art Museum in New York City and San Diego's Mingei International Museum.

A major retrospective of Hawkins paintings was organized in 2018 by the Columbus Museum of Art, the Figge Art Museum in Davenport, Iowa.

== Sources ==
- New York Times review
- Self-taught Genius exhibition from American Folk Art Museum
- Educator's Guide from Mingei
- Article on Hawkins at Hyperallergic
- Hawkins profile for Art and Antiques Magazine
