= The Old Stagecoach =

1871 painting by Eastman Johnson

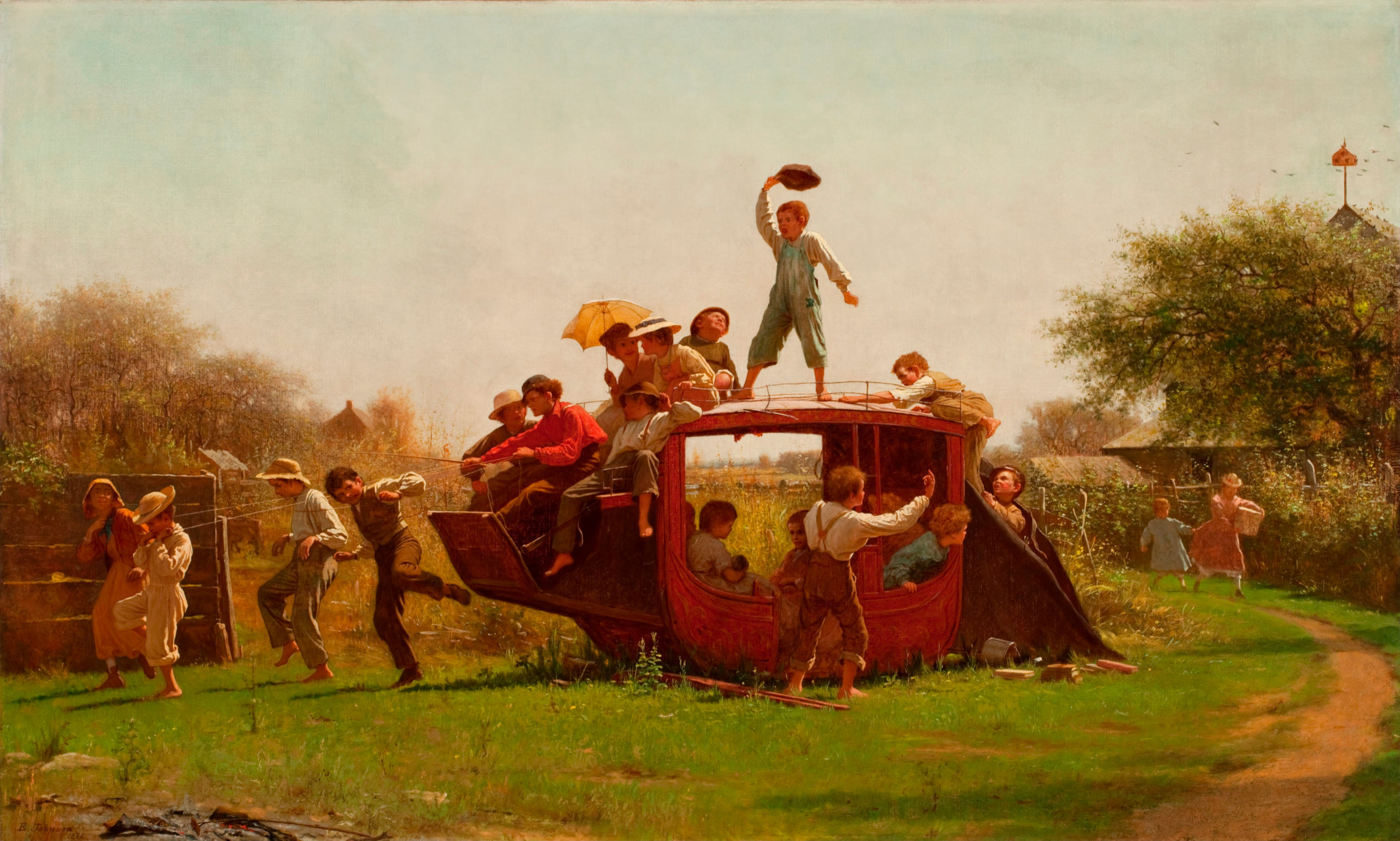
- Artist: Eastman Johnson
- Year: 1871
- Medium: Oil on canvas
- Movement: Realism
- Dimensions: 92.1 cm × 152.7 cm (36 1/4 in × 60 1/8 in)
- Location: Milwaukee Art Museum; Milwaukee

The Old Stagecoach is an oil-on-canvas painting created in 1871 by the American painter Eastman Johnson. Occasionally written as The Old Stage Coach or The Old Stage-Coach, the painting is considered one of Johnson's finest and best-known works, second only to his Antebellum masterpiece Negro Life at the South (also known as Old Kentucky Home).

== Description ==
Jennifer Greenhill described the canvas in her book Playing It Straight:

In it, a group of rural children collaborates to make a dilapidated stagecoach burst into action. Some serve as passengers, others as horses, still others as guides to the imaginary landscapes of their minds.

Johnson painted the canvas at his studio in Nantucket, Massachusetts. It has been described as his most genial work.

== Display ==
The Old Stagecoach is in the permanent collection of the Milwaukee Art Museum. In the spring of 2017 the museum built an exhibition around the painting entitled "Eastman Johnson and a Nation Divided."
