= Alfred W. Johnson =

Alfred W. Johnson may refer to:

- Vice Admiral Alfred Wilkinson Johnson, a US naval officer in the Spanish–American War and World War I
- Alfred W. Johnson, 1973 recipient of the Brewster Medal
- Alfred Webb-Johnson, 1st Baron Webb-Johnson, the first (and only) Baron Webb-Johnson
