= My Old Kentucky Home (disambiguation) =

"My Old Kentucky Home" is a song by Stephen Foster.

My Old Kentucky Home or Old Kentucky Home may also refer to:

== In places ==
- My Old Kentucky Home State Park, a park in Bardstown, Kentucky, U.S.
- Old Kentucky Home, alternative name for the Thomas Wolfe House in Asheville, North Carolina

== In media and entertainment ==
- My Old Kentucky Home (1922 film), a 1922 American silent drama film directed by Ray C. Smallwood
- My Old Kentucky Home (1926 film), an American animated short by Max and Dave Fleischer using the Lee DeForest Phonofilm sound-on-film system
- My Old Kentucky Home (1938 film), an American romantic drama film directed by Lambert Hillyer
- "My Old Kentucky Home" (Mad Men), season 3, episode 3 of the television series Mad Men (2009)
- Old Kentucky Home, the popular name of Negro Life at the South (1859), a painting by Eastman Johnson
- Just a Bird's Eye View (Of My Old Kentucky Home), a 1926 popular song by Walter Donaldson, with lyrics written by Gus Kahn
- "Old Kentucky Home", a song by Randy Newman from 12 Songs (1970) that was covered by the Beau Brummels, Johnny Cash (under the title "My Old Kentucky Home (Turpentine and Dandelion Wine)") and others which mocks the gentility of Foster's song
