= A Ride for Liberty – The Fugitive Slaves =

1862 painting by Eastman Johnson

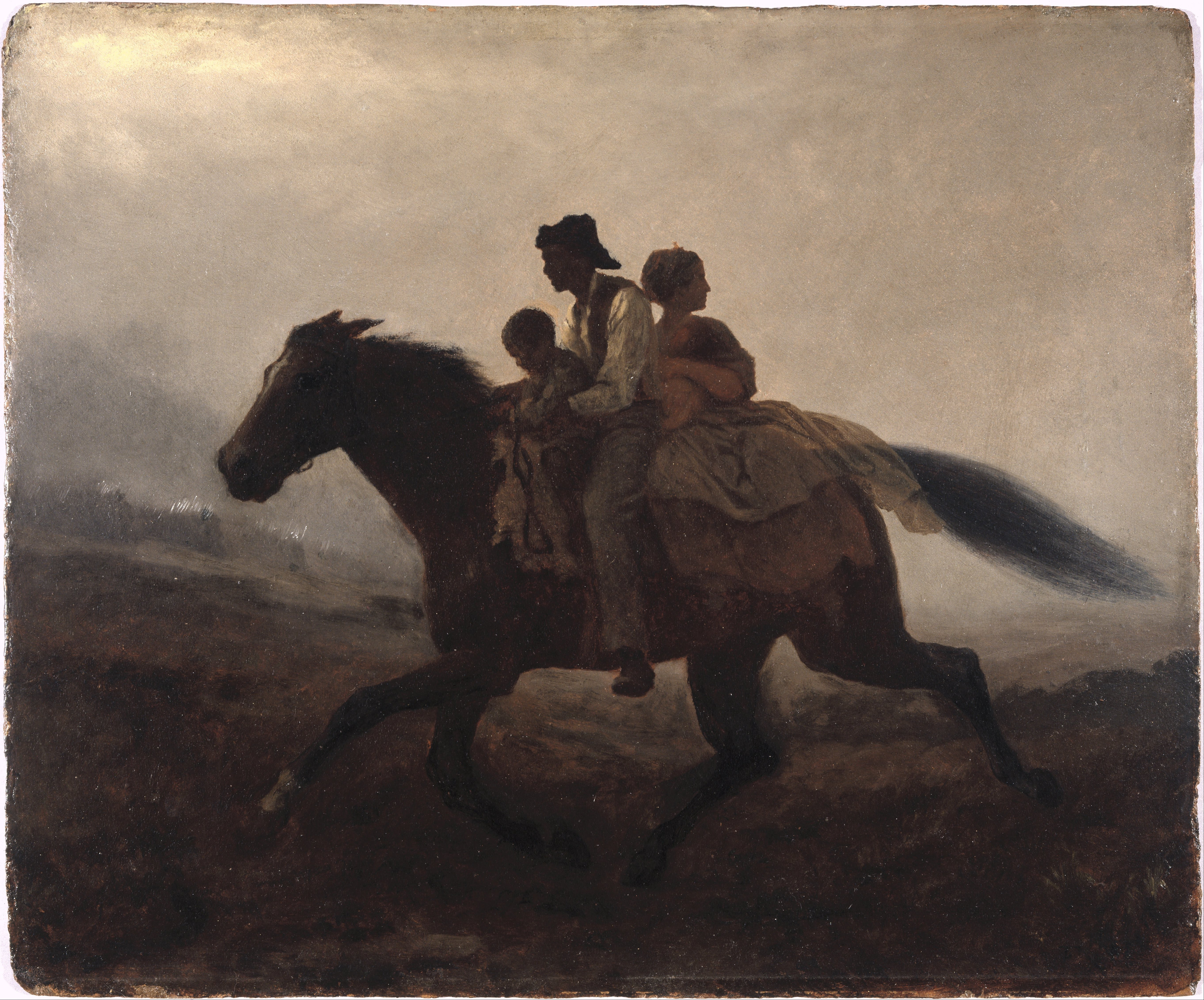
- Brooklyn Museum version
- Artist: Eastman Johnson
- Year: 1862
- Medium: Oil on paperboard
- Dimensions: 55 cm × 66 cm (21 in × 26 in)
- Location: Brooklyn Museum; Virginia Museum of Fine Arts
- Accession: 40.59a (Brooklyn Museum); 85.644 (Virginia Museum of Fine Arts)

A Ride for Liberty – The Fugitive Slaves is an oil on paperboard painting by the American artist Eastman Johnson, from 1862. It depicts a family of African Americans fleeing enslavement in the Southern United States during the American Civil War. It is based on an event that Johnson claimed to have witnessed near Manassas, Virginia, on March 2, 1862.

Johnson painted three versions of the work: two are now in public collections; the location of the third is not known. According to the Brooklyn Museum, the work is considered "virtually unique in art of the period" in portraying the former slaves as "agents of their own freedom."

== Background ==
By the late 1850s, Johnson had earned a reputation as a rising American artist, particularly with respect to genre paintings. Notably, Johnson was one of only a handful of American artists creating works depicting the lives of African Americans, having earned considerable attention with his 1859 exhibition of Negro Life at the South.

During the American Civil War, Johnson attached himself to the Union Army and, over the course of the war, would produce numerous paintings and sketches of the people and events he witnessed. In the months prior to the Second Battle of Bull Run Johnson was with the Army of the Potomac outside of Manassas, Virginia. Early in the morning on March 2, 1862, Johnson claimed to have seen a family of African Americans fleeing towards the Union Army lines in the hopes of acquiring contraband status.

== Description ==
Johnson began working on his paintings shortly after the incident, and completed three versions at some point during 1862. The locations of only two are known today: one is owned by the Brooklyn Museum and the second by the Virginia Museum of Fine Arts. Both are in oil on board, and neither appears to have been exhibited during Johnson's lifetime.

The version in the Brooklyn Museum measures 55.8 cm × 66.4 cm (22.0 in × 26.1 in) and is signed "E.J." to the lower right. The reverse side of the board bears Johnson's oil sketch of a scythe sharpening scene, also c.1862. The work was acquired by the gallery after it held an Eastman Johnson exhibition in 1940, along with Johnson's Not at Home, as gifts from the artist's granddaughter Olga Louise Gwendolyn Conkling: her father Alfred R. Conkling had married Eastman Johnson's daughter Ethel. The version in the Virginia Museum of Fine Arts is in its Paul Mellon Collection. It is a similar size, measuring 54.61 cm × 66.04 cm (21.50 in × 26.00 in), and is signed " E. Johnson". A manuscript label on the back of the painting signed by the artist recounts: "A veritable incident/in the Civil War seen by/myself at Centerville/on this morning of/McClellan's advance towards Manassas March 2, 1862/Eastman Johnson."

The paintings depict a family of four African-American slaves on horseback in the murky early morning light. In front, a child sits in the lap of his father, with his mother riding on the back of the horse holding an infant. The horse appears in motion, galloping away from the source of their enslavement and towards Union Army lines. The man is looking ahead, the child down at the horse, and the woman back in case they are being pursued. In the Brooklyn version, some vertical glints ahead of the horse indicate the bayonets and sabers of soldiers about to fight in the distance, but this detail becomes horizontal streaks of morning light in the Virginia version.

== Legacy ==
A Ride for Liberty – The Fugitive Slaves is considered one of Johnson's best works and a highlight of his career as an artist. It has also been praised by historians as one of only a handful of contemporary works depicting the plight of slaves fleeing captivity in the South.
