= The Lord is my shepherd (disambiguation) =

The Lord is my shepherd are the first words of Psalm 23 (King James version).

The Lord is my shepherd may also refer to:

- The Lord Is My Shepherd (Eastman Johnson), an oil on wood painting (1863)
- The Lord Is My Shepherd (Rutter), a choral composition by John Rutter setting verses from Psalm 23 (1978)
- "The Lord's My Shepherd", a 1650 hymn attributed to Francis Rous
