= Hassler (vessel) =

Coordinates: 58°58′46″N 135°13′17″W

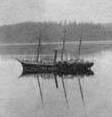
- Hassler circa 1897

History

United States
- Name: USCSS Hassler
- Namesake: Ferdinand Rudolph Hassler
- Operator: United States Coast Survey
- Ordered: 1870
- Builder: Dialogue & Company, River Iron Works, Camden, New Jersey
- Cost: $62,000
- Commissioned: 1871
- Decommissioned: 25 May 1895
- Fate: Sold into commercial service, August 1897; Wrecked and sunk, 5 February 1898

General characteristics
- Type: Survey ship
- Length: 151 ft (46 m)
- Beam: 24 ft 6 in (7.47 m)
- Depth of hold: 10 ft (3.0 m)
- Propulsion: 1 × 125 hp (93 kW) steeple compound engine
- Sail plan: 3-masted schooner

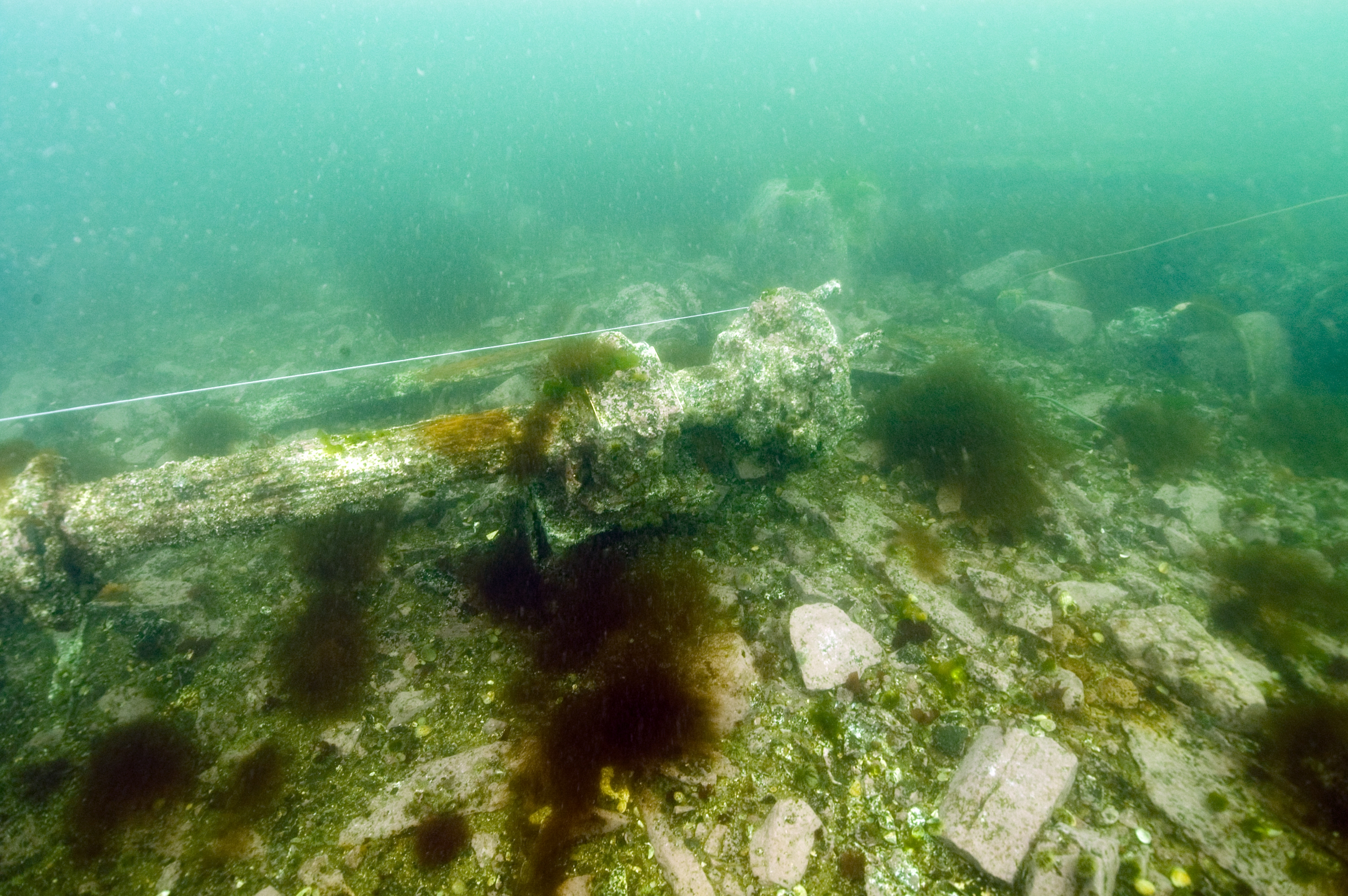
Shaft of Hassler, shipwrecked on the Alaskan coast.

The schooner Hassler was the first iron-hulled steamship used in the service of the United States Coast Survey.

== Ship history ==
Plans for a new ship to chart the waters of U.S. Pacific Coast were drawn up in early 1870 by Carlile Patterson, the hydrographic inspector of the U.S. Coast Survey. Patterson called for an iron-hulled ship of about 325 gross tons, with a draft of no more than 9 feet (2.7 m) and a top speed of 8 knots (15 km/h; 9.2 mph). He required that the ship use no more than 2½ tons of coal per day and could hold up to two months of provisions for a crew of 37. The resulting ship was built in 1871 at the River Iron Works in Camden, New Jersey, under the supervision of John H. Dialogue. She was a three-masted schooner equipped with a 125 hp (93 kW) steeple compound engine, and cost US$62,000 to build.

In 1871-1872 the ship sailed on the Hassler Expedition, under Commander Philip Carrigan Johnson, brother of the artist Eastman Johnson. This was the first major scientific expedition sent by the government for marine exploration. The expedition included Professor Louis Agassiz and his wife Elizabeth Agassiz; Mrs. Johnson; Dr. Franz Steindachner, ichthyologist; Dr. Thomas Hill, botanist; Count L. F. de Pourtalès, Joel Asaph Allen, James Henry Blake, and others.

The steamer left Boston December 4, 1871, and reached San Francisco in August 1872. On the way to St. Thomas surface observations were made. Deep-sea dredging was done at Barbados and along the Brazilian coast. At the Straits of Magellan frequent stops were made, and at particularly interesting places several days were spent, and inland excursions undertaken, especially to examine glaciers. Throughout the route collections were made, with much of this material deposited in the Museum of Comparative Zoology at Harvard University. Some of the zoological results of the expedition were published by Agassiz, Lyman, and Pourtalès.

After nearly 25 years in service, mostly around the Alaskan coast, the Hassler was finally decommissioned on May 25, 1895. In August 1897 she was sold to the McGuire Brothers for $15,700, and renamed Clara Nevada. She sailed from Seattle on January 26, 1898, with a crew of 40 men, bound for Skagway, Alaska with 165 passengers heading for the Klondike gold fields. Late on February 5, 1898, the Clara Nevada left Skagway with between 25 and 40 passengers aboard. During the night she struck an uncharted rock several hundred yards north of Eldred Rock and sank immediately. There were no survivors.
