= Philip C. Johnson Jr. =

American Navy officer (1828–1887)

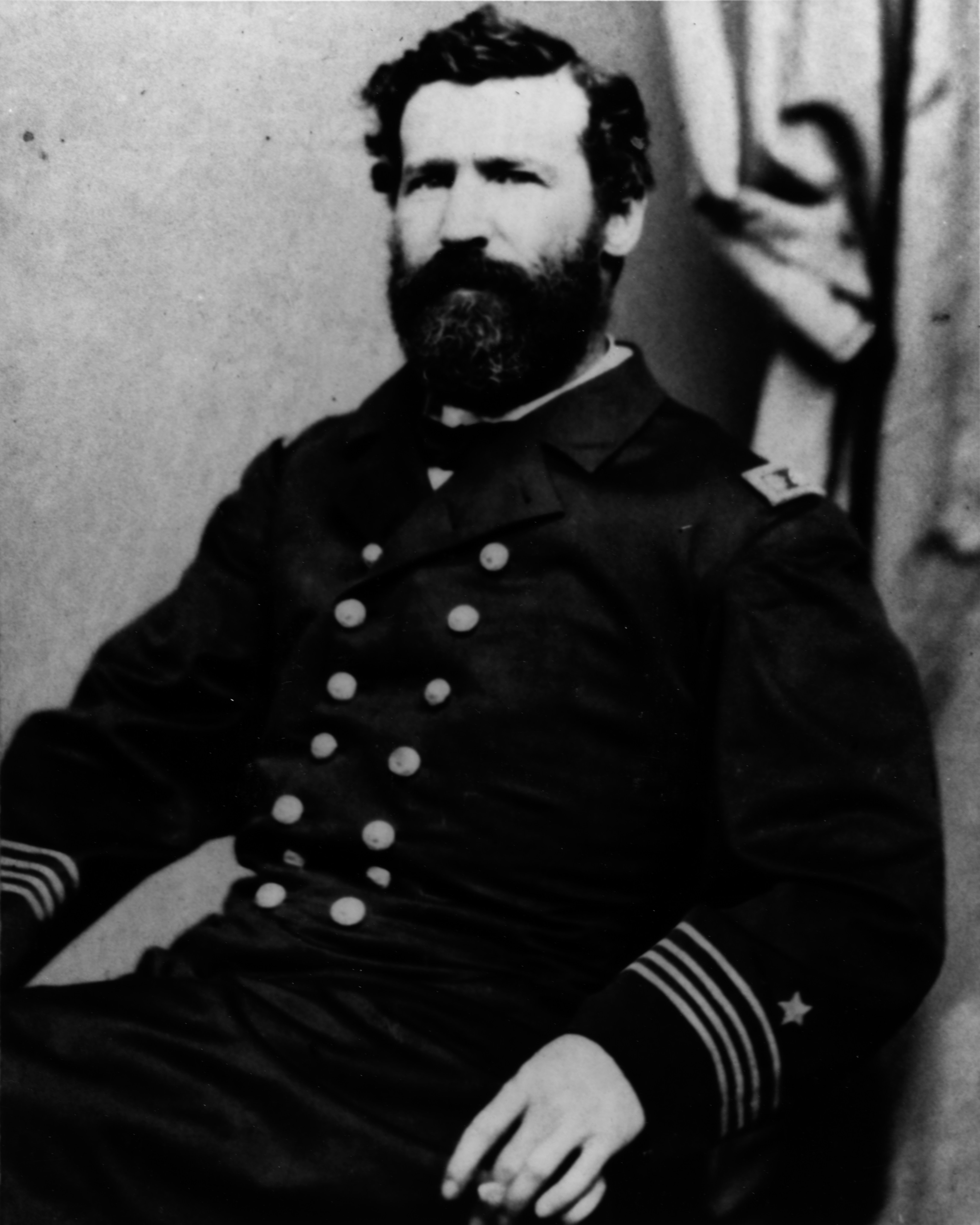
- As a lieutenant commander circa 1863
- Born: 21 November 1828; Fryeburg, Maine
- Died: 28 January 1887 (aged 58) Portsmouth, New Hampshire
- Allegiance: United States of America
- Branch: United States Navy; Union Navy
- Service years: 1846–1887
- Rank: Commodore; Rear Admiral (posthumous)
- Commands: Portsmouth Navy Yard; USS New Hampshire; USS Richmond; USS Omaha; USCSS Hassler; USS Constitution; USS Katahdin; USS Tennessee
- Conflicts: Mexican–American War; American Civil War

Philip Carrigan Johnson Jr. (21 November 1828 – 28 January 1887) was a United States Navy officer. He served during the Mexican–American War and commanded two ships in combat during the American Civil War. After the war, he commanded the coastal survey ship Hassler from 1871 to 1872 during an expedition to the Strait of Magellan and both southern coasts of South America accompanied by natural historian Louis Agassiz.

== Biography ==
Johnson was born in Fryeburg, Maine in 1828. His family moved to Augusta, Maine in 1833 and then to Washington, D.C. in 1845. He was appointed midshipman from Maine on 31 August 1846. Johnson served with the Home Squadron during the Bombardment of Veracruz in March 1847 and the Battle of Tuxpan in April 1847.

From 1847 to 1848, Johnson served aboard the ship-of-the-line USS Ohio in the Pacific Squadron. After classroom instruction on shore, he served aboard the frigate USS Congress in the Brazil Squadron from 1850 to 1851. Johnson then returned to the United States Naval Academy, graduating in 1852. He was promoted to passed midshipman on 8 June 1852.

After graduation, Johnson served aboard the stores ship USS Fredonia in the Pacific Squadron. From 1854 to 1859, he was assigned to the Office of Coast Survey, serving aboard the survey ship Active. Johnson was promoted to master on 15 September 1855 and then to lieutenant on 16 September 1855. From 1859 to 1861, he served aboard the screw frigate USS San Jacinto along the African coast.

After the outbreak of the Civil War, Johnson was given command of the captured steamer USS Tennessee in the Western Gulf Squadron until 1863. He participated in the Battle of Forts Jackson and St. Philip. Johnson was promoted to lieutenant commander effective 16 July 1862. He next commanded the gunboat USS Katahdin in the Western Gulf Squadron until December 1863.

From April 1864 to February 1866, Johnson was assigned to the Naval Academy and given command of the training ship USS Constitution, first at Newport, Rhode Island and then returning to Annapolis, Maryland after the end of the Civil War. From September 1866 to March 1867, he served aboard the sloop-of-war USS Sacramento. Johnson was promoted to commander effective 2 February 1867. From 1868 to 1870, he was fleet captain in the South Pacific Squadron.

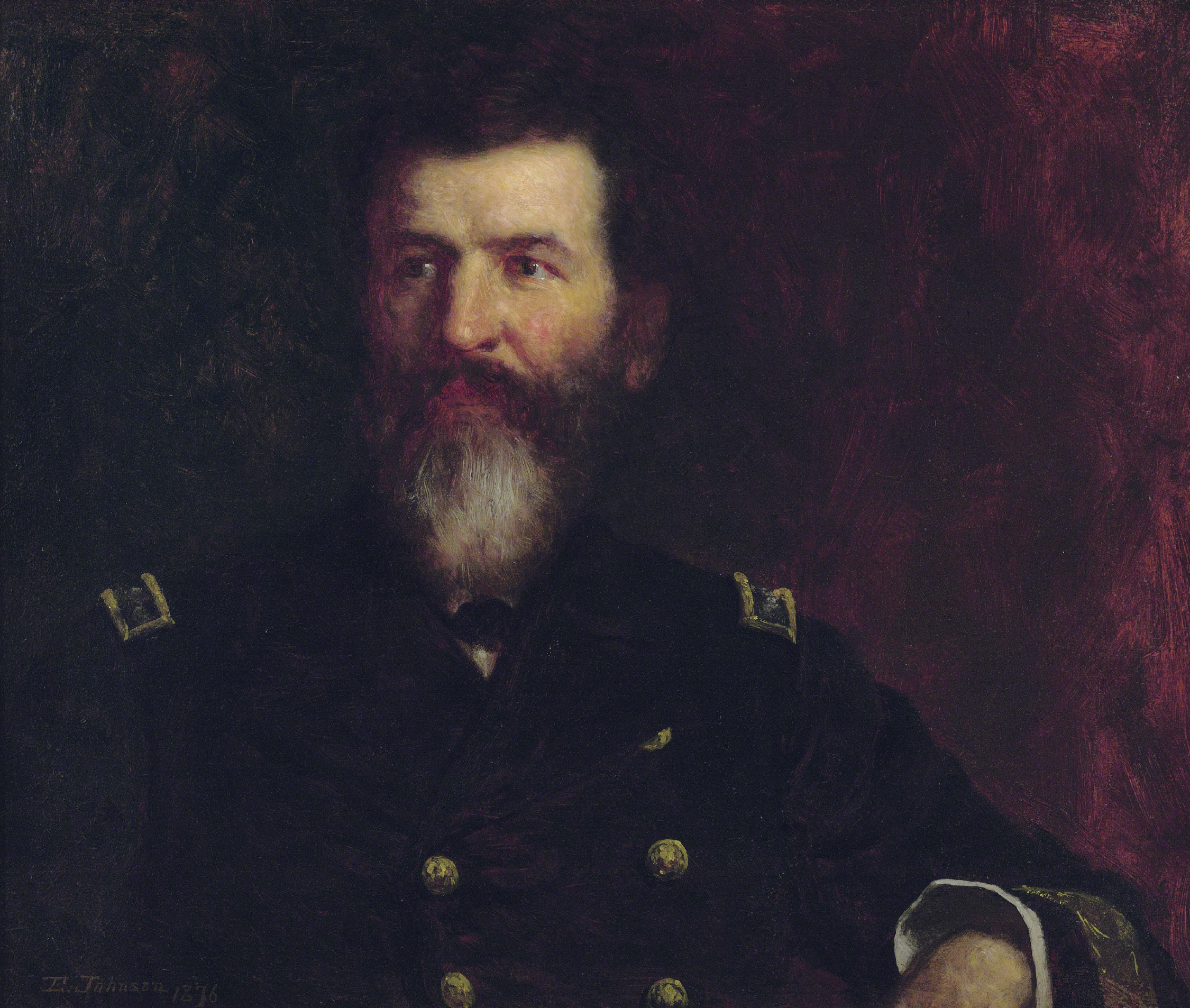
Portrait of Johnson as a captain in 1876 by his brother Eastman Johnson

From 1871 to 1874, Johnson returned to the Office of Coast Survey, commanding the survey ship Hassler. He was promoted to captain on 14 June 1874 and given command of the screw sloop USS Omaha in the South Pacific Squadron. From 1875 to 1876, Johnson commanded the steam sloop USS Richmond in the South Pacific Squadron. From 1877 to 1881, he was captain of the yard at the Mare Island Navy Yard.

In June 1881, Johnson was given command of the training ship USS New Hampshire. From November 1881 to June 1884, he was assigned as Chief Signal Officer at the Navy Department in Washington, D.C. On 28 July 1884, Johnson was promoted to commodore. In October 1884, he assumed command of the Portsmouth Navy Yard.

Selected to command the Pacific Squadron, Johnson died in Portsmouth, New Hampshire on the morning of 28 January 1887, only a few hours before his scheduled promotion to rear admiral. As a result, Lewis A. Kimberly was promoted instead, replacing Edward Y. McCauley as squadron commander. The cause of his death was Bright's disease resulting from a contusion which occurred during the course of his duties at the navy yard.

Four years later, Johnson was posthumously promoted to rear admiral retroactive to 25 January 1887 (the date of Rear Adm. McCauley's retirement) by a special act of Congress. H.R. 6559 was passed by the House of Representatives on 29 January 1891 and then by the Senate on 3 March 1891.

== Personal ==
Johnson was the son of Philip Carrigan Johnson and Mary Kimball (Chandler) Johnson. His father was a businessman who was appointed Secretary of State of Maine by Governor John Fairfield and then served in the civilian leadership of the Navy Department during the Polk administration. Philip Johnson Jr. had five sisters and two older brothers, one of whom was painter Eastman Johnson.

Johnson married Elvira Lindsay Acevedo (17 February 1838 – 8 February 1908), the daughter of a Scotsman and a Chilean, on 8 January 1870 in Talcahuano. His wife aided Elizabeth Agassiz in her social investigations of indigenous cultures during the 1871–1872 Hassler expedition. Naval officer Alfred Wilkinson Johnson, who retired from active duty as a vice admiral, was their son.

Johnson and his wife are buried in Section 2 of Arlington National Cemetery.
