= The Hatch Family =

Painting by Eastman Johnson

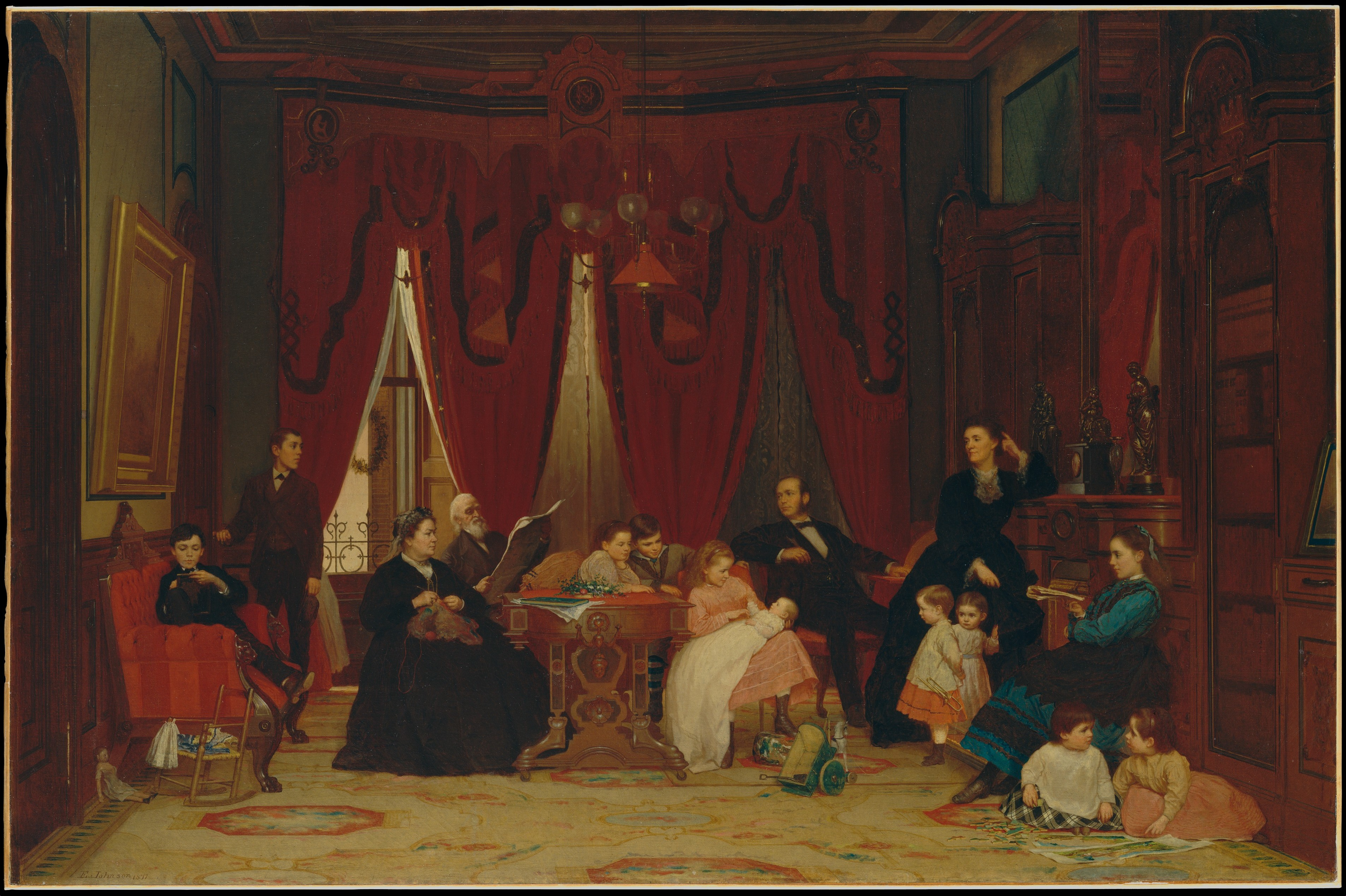
- Artist: Eastman Johnson
- Year: 1870–71
- Medium: Oil on canvas
- Dimensions: 121.9 cm × 186.4 cm (48.0 in × 73.4 in)
- Location: Metropolitan Museum of Art; New York City
- Accession: 26.97

The Hatch Family is a mid 19th century painting by American artist Eastman Johnson. Done in oil on canvas, the painting depicts the Hatch Family of 19th century New York City. The titular Hatches were a family of prominent stock traders who managed Fisk and Hatch, a large brokerage firm. Johnson's painting is set in the Hatches' library, and depicts three generations of the family. Currently in the collection of the Metropolitan Museum of Art, The Hatch Family is considered one of Johnson's finest works.
