= The Lord Is My Shepherd (Eastman Johnson) =

1863 painting by Eastman Johnson

External videos
- Podcast: The Civil War and American Art, Episode 4, Smithsonian American Art Museum

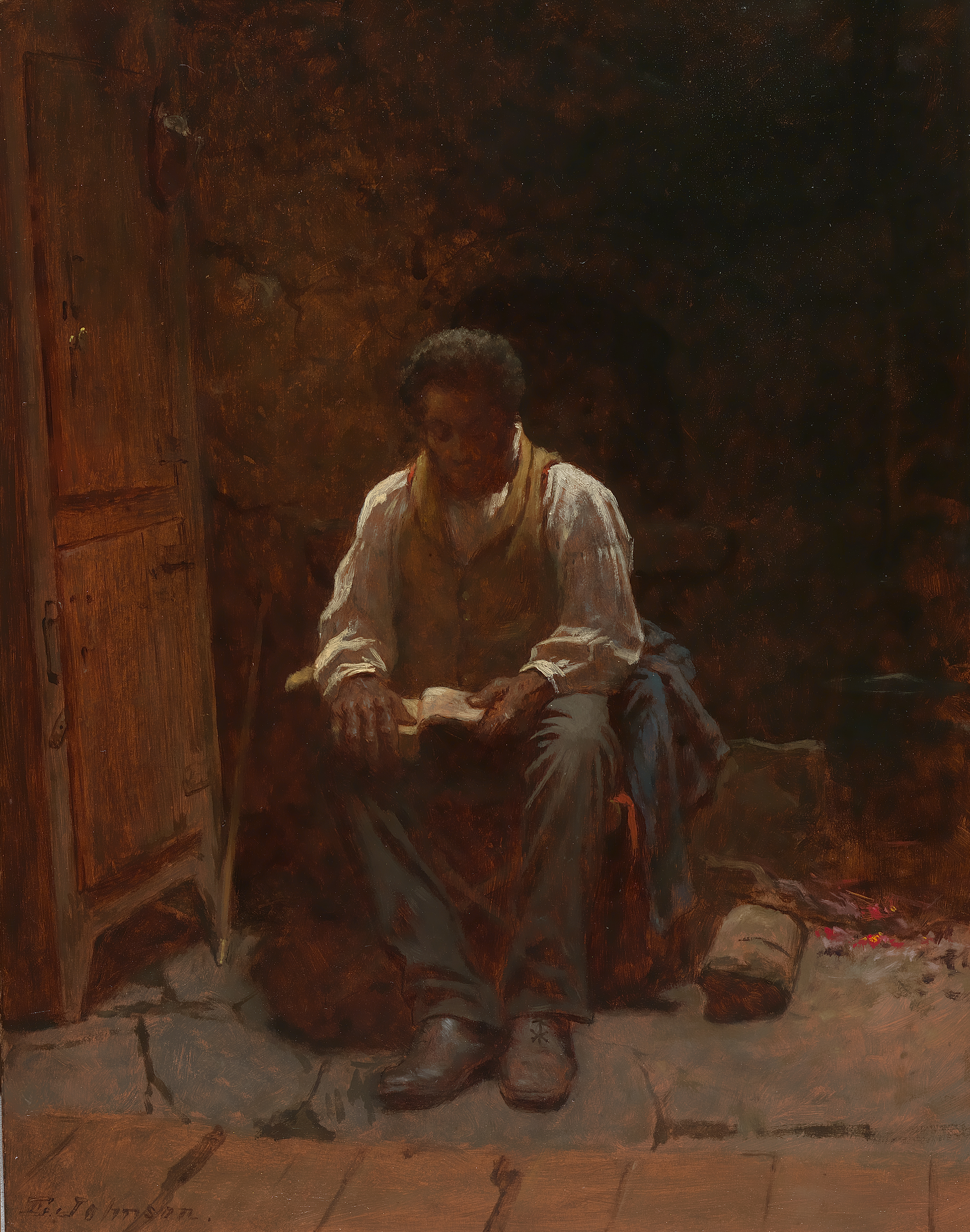
The Lord Is My Shepherd (1863) by Eastman Johnson

The Lord Is My Shepherd is an 1863 oil-on-wood painting by American artist Eastman Johnson. The painting measures 16 5/8 x 13 1/8 in. (42.3 x 33.2 cm.) and is on display at the Smithsonian American Art Museum, in Washington, D.C.

The title of the painting comes from Psalm 23, which begins with the line: "The Lord is my shepherd; I shall not want." Johnson painted it just after the Emancipation Proclamation was announced in 1863. Its imagery includes an African-American man reading the first part of a Bible, possibly the Book of Exodus. He is sitting against a blue jacket, which may indicate service in the Union army. President Abraham Lincoln had recently authorized organization of the United States Colored Troops. This is one of several works by Eastman Johnson with African-American subjects.
