= Eastman Johnson =

American painter (1824–1906)

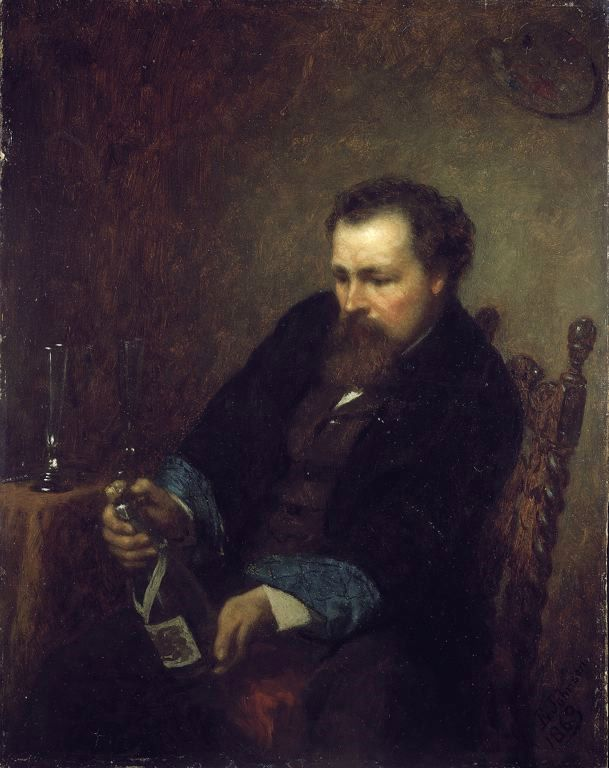
- Self-portrait of Eastman Johnson, 1863
- Born: July 29, 1824; Lovell, Maine
- Died: April 5, 1906 (aged 81); New York
- Known for: Painting

Jonathan Eastman Johnson (July 29, 1824 – April 5, 1906) was an American painter and co-founder of the Metropolitan Museum of Art, New York City, with his name inscribed at its entrance. He was best known for his genre paintings, paintings of scenes from everyday life, and his portraits both of everyday people and prominent Americans such as Abraham Lincoln, Nathaniel Hawthorne, Ralph Waldo Emerson, and Henry Wadsworth Longfellow. His later works often show the influence of the 17th-century Dutch masters, whom he studied in The Hague in the 1850s; he was known as The American Rembrandt in his day.

== Life ==
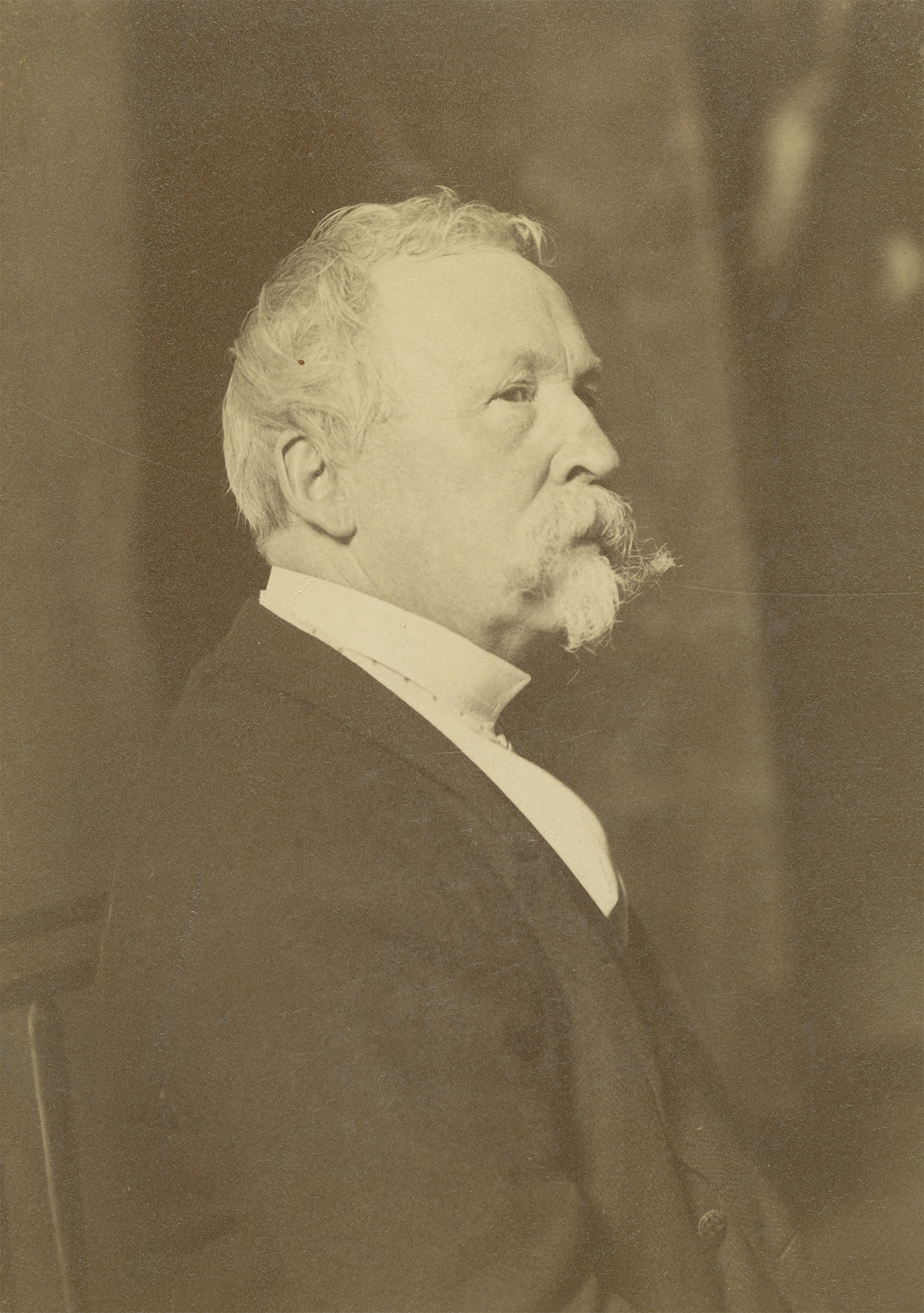
Eastman Johnson, 1890s, albumen print (cabinet card) by Edwin S. Bennett, Department of Image Collections, National Gallery of Art Library, Washington, DC

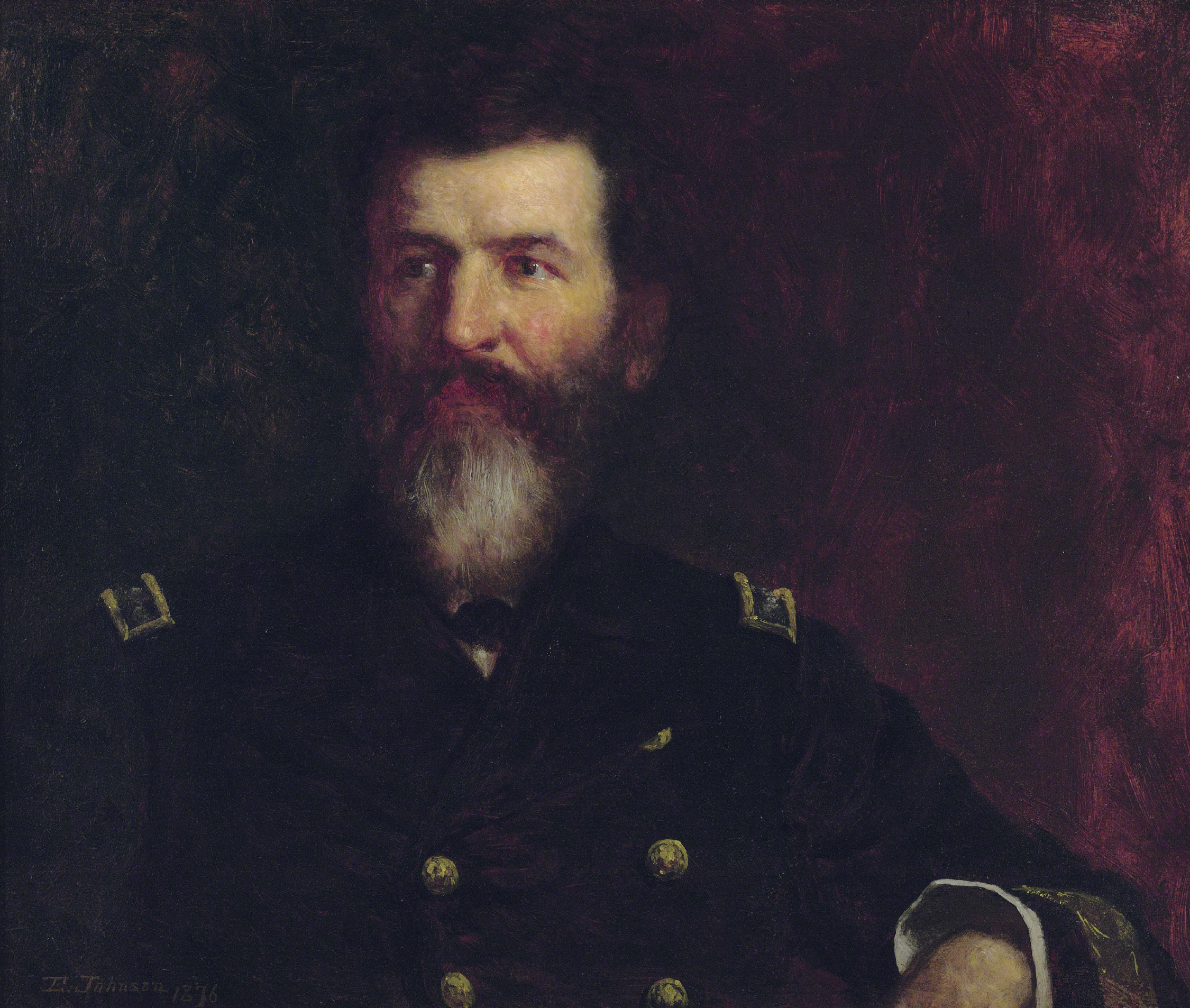
Eastman Johnson's portrait of his brother, Commodore Philip Carrigan Johnson, oil on canvas, 21 × 25 in., 1876

Johnson was born in Lovell, Maine, one of the eight children of Philip Carrigan Johnson and Mary Kimball Chandler (born in New Hampshire, October 18, 1796, married 1818). His siblings were brothers Reuben and Philip, sisters Harriet, Judith, Mary, Sarah and Nell. (His younger brother Philip became a Commodore in the United States Navy and father of Vice Admiral Alfred Wilkinson Johnson.)

Eastman grew up in Fryeburg and Augusta, where the family lived at Pleasant Street and later at 61 Winthrop Street. His father was the owner of several businesses, and active in fraternal organizations: he was Grand Secretary of the Grand Lodge of Maine (ancient Free and Accepted Masons) (1836–1844). He was appointed in 1840 as Secretary of State for Maine, serving two years.

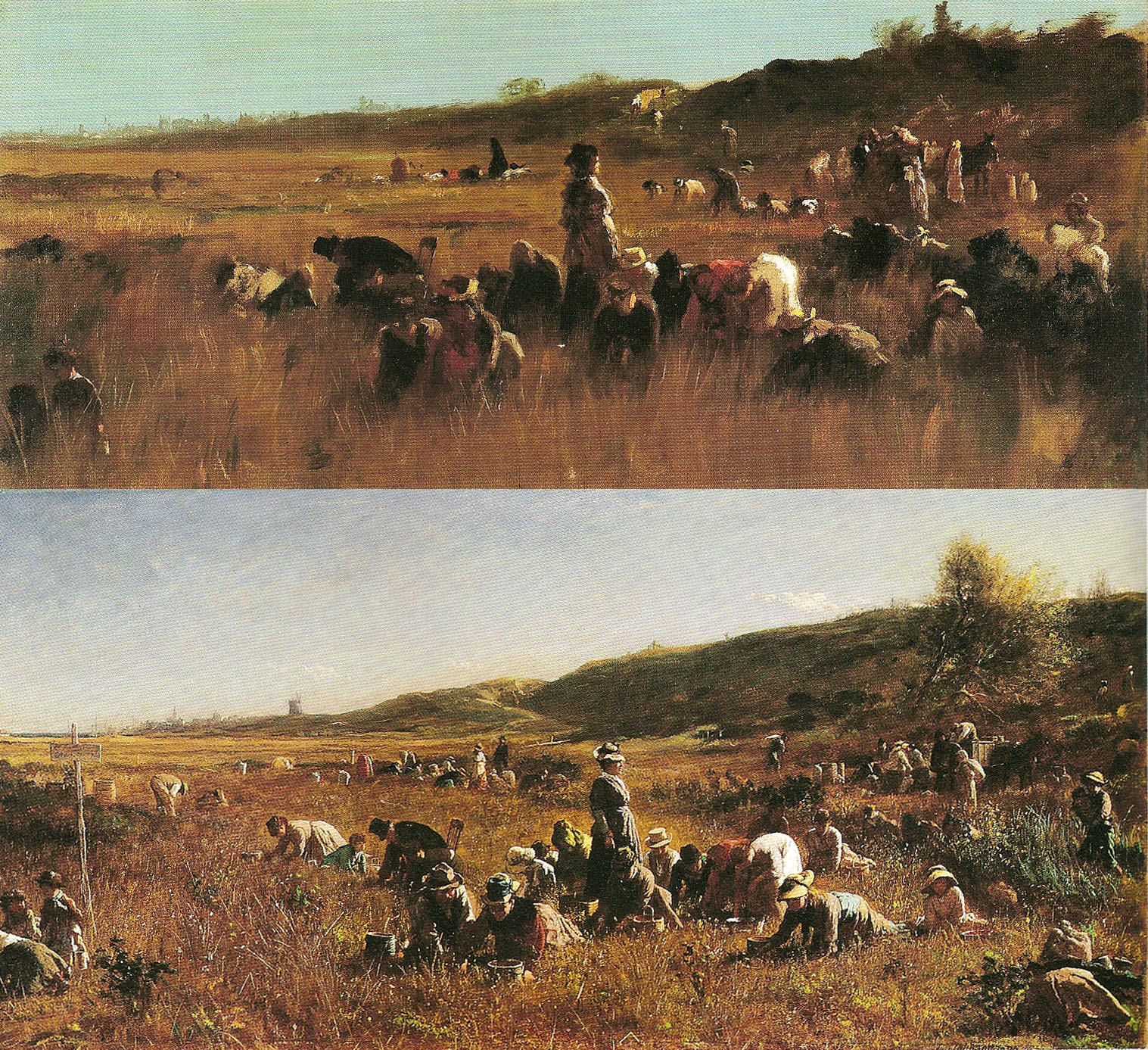
Comparison of Cranberry Pickers, Nantucket (1879) and The Cranberry Harvest, Island of Nantucket (1880). Both are oil on canvas

== Career ==
Eastman Johnson's career as an artist began when his father apprenticed him in 1840 to a Boston lithographer. After his father's political patron, the Governor of Maine John Fairfield, entered the US Senate, the senior Johnson was appointed by US President James Polk in the late 1840s as Chief Clerk in the Bureau of Construction, Equipment, and Repair of the Navy Department. The family moved to Washington, DC and first lived in rental housing. In 1853, they bought a new rowhouse at 266 F Street, between Thirteenth and Fourteenth streets and a few blocks from the White House and the Navy Department offices, which became their permanent home. Although the young Johnson lived for a time in Boston, and studied in Europe, he used this home as his base until moving to New York City in the late 1850s.

The young Johnson moved to Washington, D.C. at about age 20, supporting himself by making crayon portraits, including John Quincy Adams, and Dolley Madison, and likely helped by his father's political connections. He returned to New England, settling in Boston in 1846 at the age of 22.

In 1849, Johnson went overseas to Germany, for further studies at the Kunstakademie Düsseldorf. This had become a new center where many artists, including many Americans, studied art. They took part in the Düsseldorf school of painting.

In January 1851, Johnson was accepted into the studio of Emanuel Gottlieb Leutze, a German who had lived in the United States for a while before returning to Germany. His major work completed there is his portrait of Worthington Whittredge.

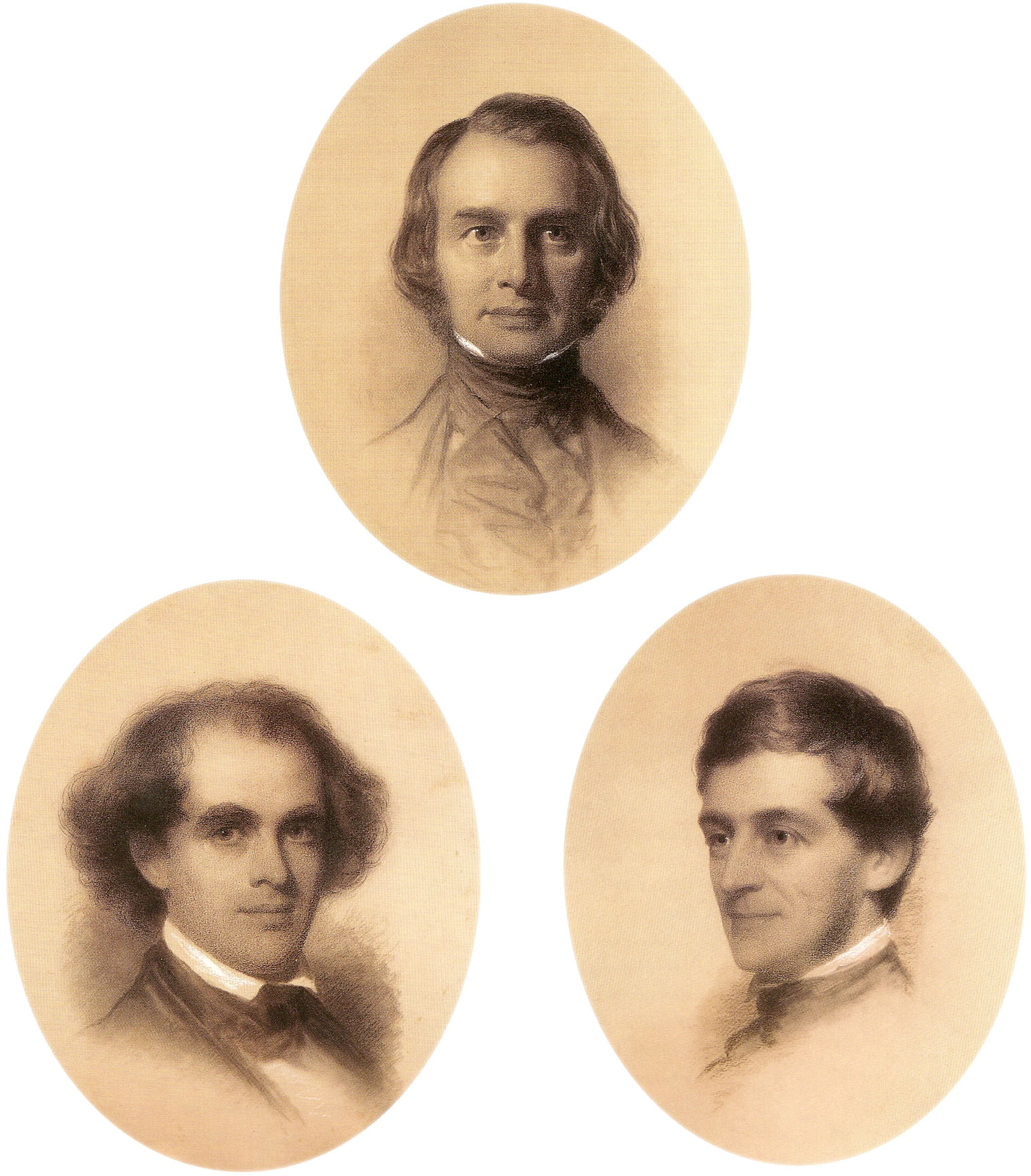
Henry Wadsworth Longfellow – Nathaniel Hawthorne – Ralph Waldo Emerson, crayon and chalk on paper, each 21 × 19 in. oval, 1846

Johnson moved to The Hague, where he studied 17th-century Dutch and Flemish masters. He ended his European travels in Paris, studying with the academic painter Thomas Couture in 1855 before returning to the United States that year due to the death of his mother.

In 1856, he visited his sister Sarah and her family in Superior, Wisconsin. His mixed-race guide Stephen Bonga, who was Ojibwe and African-American, took Johnson among the native Anishinaabe (Ojibwe) in the areas around Superior. Throughout 1857 Johnson frequently painted them in intimate, casual poses. According to the Wisconsin Historical Society, Johnson traveled with Bonga to the areas today known as Grand Portage National Monument, Apostle Islands National Monument, and Isle Royale National Park.

By 1859, Johnson had returned to the East and established a studio in New York City. He secured his reputation as an American artist that year with an exhibit at the National Academy of Design featuring his painting, Negro Life at the South (1859) or, as it was popularly called, Old Kentucky Home. It was set in the urban back yards of Washington, DC rather than on a plantation. That year Johnson was elected into the National Academy of Design as an Associate member and became a full Academician in 1860.

Johnson also became a member of the Union League Club of New York, which holds many of his paintings. In 1869, at the age of 55, he married for the first time, to Elizabeth Buckley. They had one daughter, Ethel Eastman Johnson, born in 1870. Ethel married Alfred Ronalds Conkling (nephew of Senator Roscoe Conkling) in 1896.

When he died in 1906 at age 81, Eastman Johnson was buried at Green-Wood Cemetery in Brooklyn, New York.

== Style ==
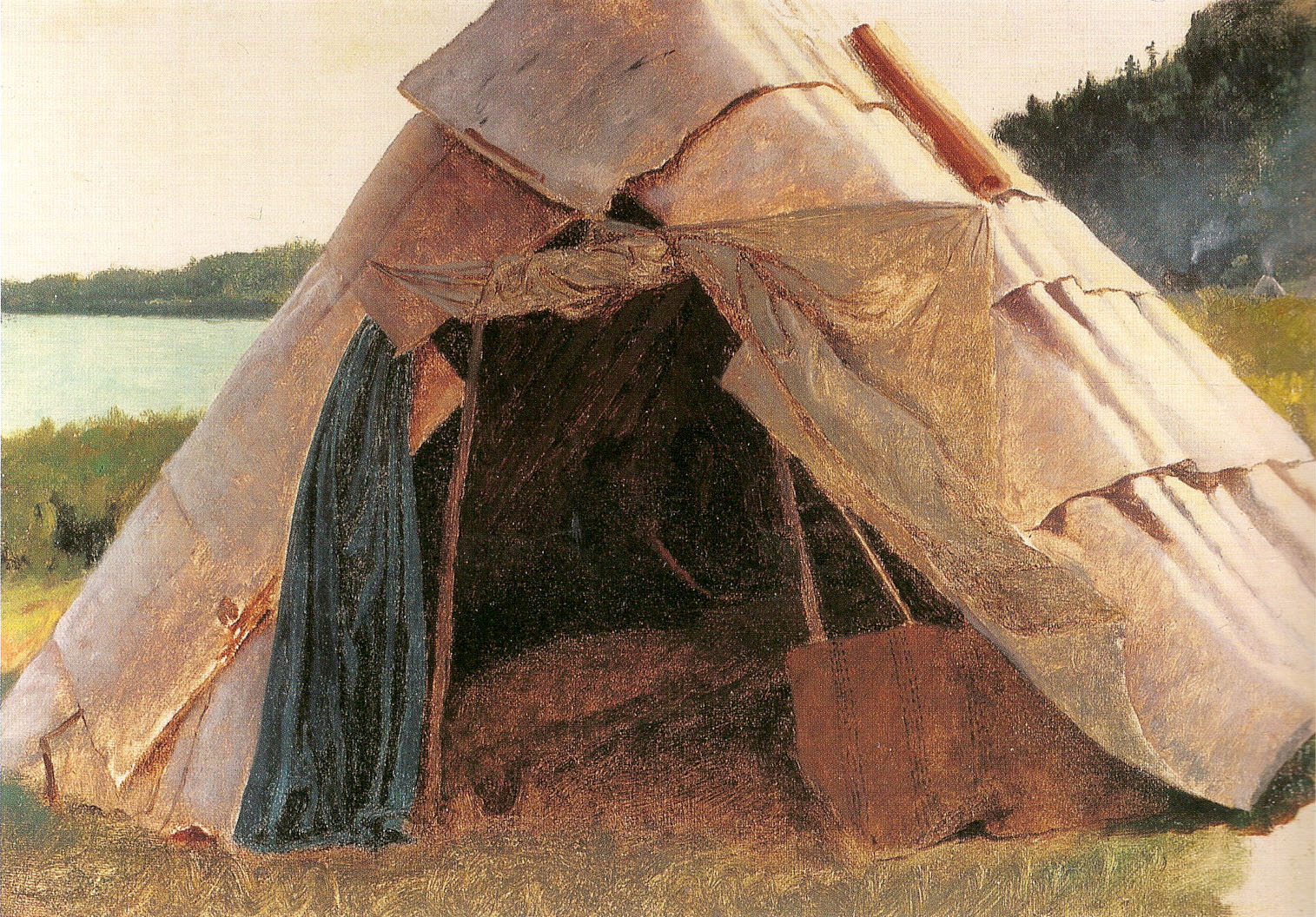
Ojibwe Wigwam at Grand Portage, oil on canvas, 1857, 10 × 15 in. Courtesy of the St. Louis County Historical Society, Duluth, MN.

Johnson's style is largely realistic in both subject matter and in execution. His charcoal sketches were not strongly influenced by period artists, but are informed more by his lithography training. Later works show influence by the 17th-century Dutch and Flemish masters, and also by Jean-François Millet. Echoes of Millet's The Gleaners can be seen in Johnson's The Cranberry Harvest, Island of Nantucket, although the emotional tone of the work is far different.

His careful portrayal of individuals rather than stereotypes enhances the realism of his paintings. Ojibwe artist Carl Gawboy notes that the faces in the 1857 portraits of Ojibwe people by Johnson are recognizable in people in the Ojibwe community today. Some of his paintings, such as Ojibwe Wigwam at Grand Portage, are highly realistic, with details seen in the later photorealism movement.

His careful attention to light sources contributes to the realism. Portraits, Girl and Pets and The Boy Lincoln, make use of single light sources in a manner that is similar to the 17th-century Dutch Masters whom he had studied in The Hague in the 1850s.

== Subject matter ==
=== Portraits ===
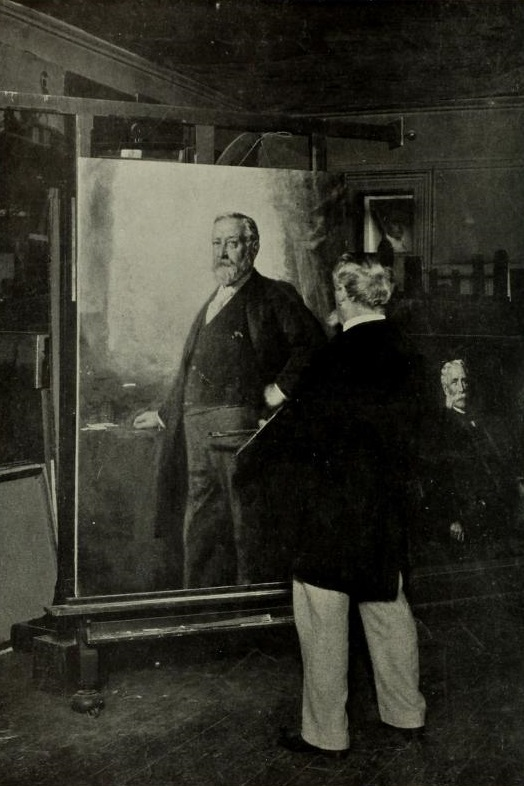
Eastman Johnson painting a full portrait of President Benjamin Harrison.

Johnson's subject matter included portraits of the wealthy and influential, from the President of the United States to literary figures to unnamed individuals. He is best known for his paintings of everyday people in everyday scenes. Johnson often repainted the same subject changing style or details.

=== New England ===
His works of New England life, such as The Cranberry Harvest, Island of Nantucket, The Old Stagecoach, Husking Bee, Island of Nantucket, The Sap Gatherers, and Sugaring Off at the Camp, Fryeburg, Maine, established him as a genre painter. Over the course of five years, he made many sketches and smaller paintings of the processing of maple sap into maple sugar, but never completed the larger work he had started.

In contrast, he developed the much celebrated Old Stagecoach mostly in his studio, and he carefully planned its composition. The stage coach was based on an abandoned coach which he had come across and sketched while hiking in the Catskills. He used local children recruited as models from near his Nantucket studio. Despite this artifice, the painting was celebrated as wholesome, natural and bucolic.

=== Ojibwe ===
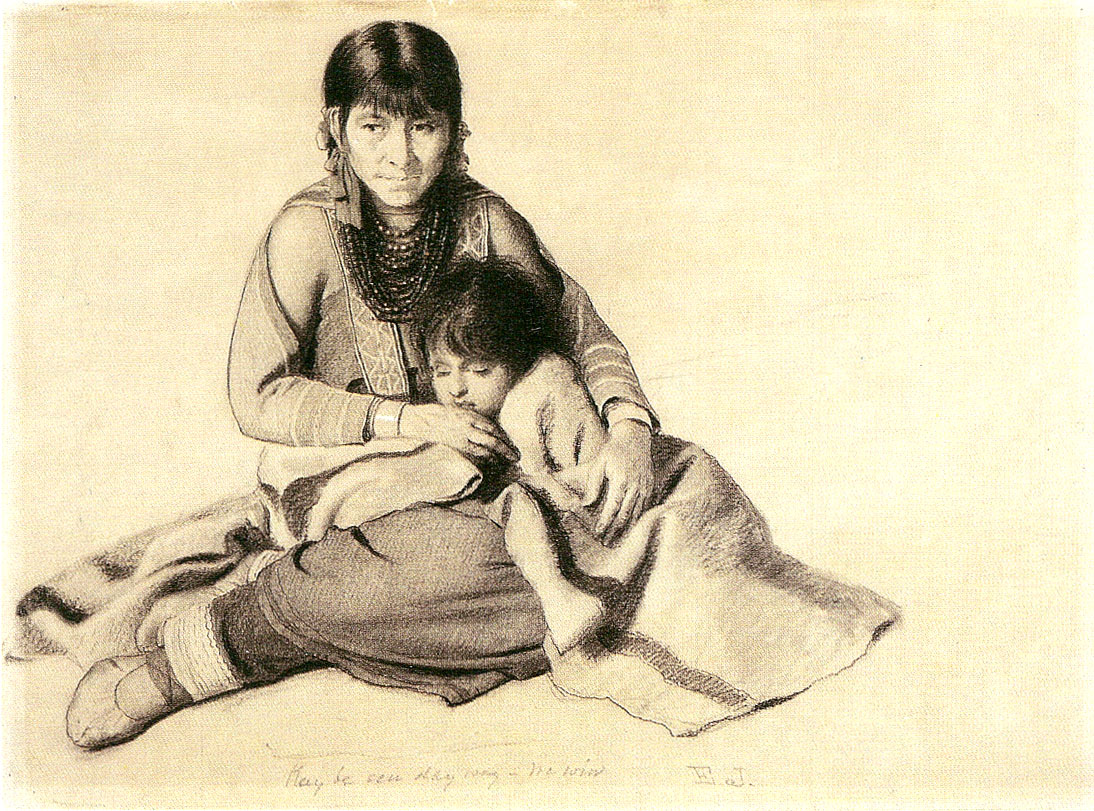
Kay be sen day way We Win, charcoal and crayon on paper, 1857, 11 × 14 in. Courtesy of the St. Louis County Historical Society, Duluth, MN.

In 1856–1857, Johnson visited his sister Sarah and brother in Superior on the western frontier of Wisconsin at Lake Superior. He was aided in traveling in the area and in meeting Ojibwe people by Stephen Bonga, an interpreter and guide of Ojibwe/African-American parents.

Carl Gawboy, a modern-day Ojibwe artist, speculates that Johnson's time with Bonga and his mixed-race family (Bonga had an Ojibwe wife as well as mother) changed his approach to painting. Certainly Johnson was successful in getting many Ojibwe to sit for him as subjects. In his drawings and paintings, Johnson portrayed Ojibwe people in a more intimate and relaxed manner than was usual for paintings of that period. Also unusual was that he often included the subject's names in the titles of the works. He did not focus solely on individual portraits, but also did paintings and sketches of scenes which include Ojibwe dwellings, St. Louis Bay, and other groupings of Ojibwe in everyday activities.

Johnson left Wisconsin due to a widespread financial panic, which rendered his real estate investments there worthless. He moved to Cincinnati, Ohio to earn money by portrait commissions, and never returned to the subject of the Ojibwe. His paintings and sketches of the Ojibwe remained unsold during his lifetime. They are now owned by the St. Louis County Historical Society in Duluth, Minnesota.

=== Slavery ===
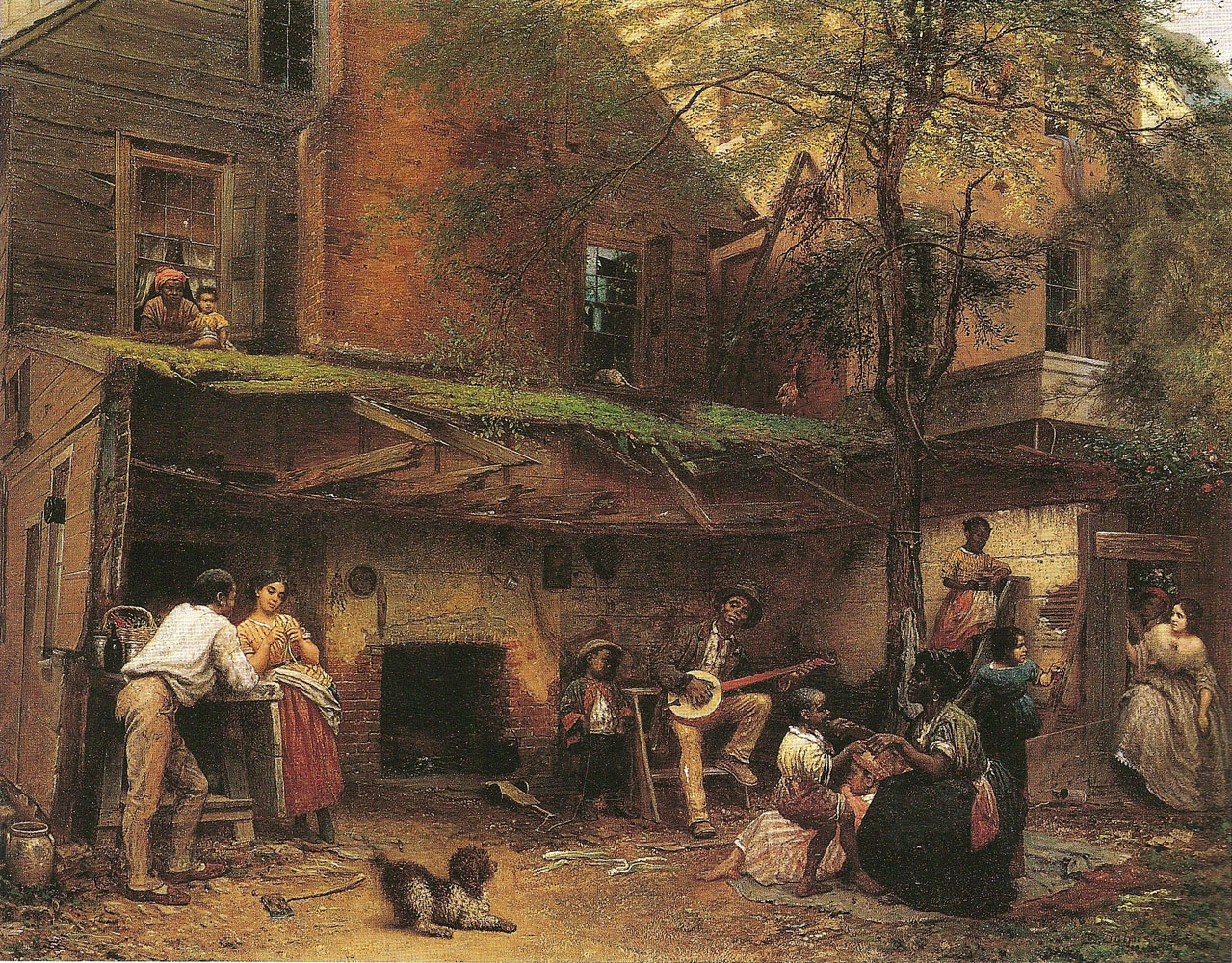
Negro Life at the South, oil on canvas, 1859, 36 × 45 in.

Negro Life at the South (1859), completed shortly before the Civil War began, is considered Johnson's masterpiece. Because of its complexity, it has been analyzed and interpreted at length by scholars. The painting depicts an urban "back street" scene of slaves in Washington, DC, although it became popularly known from that year as Old Kentucky Home (based on the song "My Old Kentucky Home" by Stephen Foster) and was referred to as showing plantation life. The painting shows a range of domestic activities behind a dilapidated house, with a house of better condition to the right. (The setting is the backyard of slave quarters near Johnson's father's house in Washington.)

On the left in the foreground are a young black man and light-skinned woman courting, in the middle is a banjo player making music, where an adult woman dances with a child, as others look on. At the right edge, a young white woman in a refined white dress steps over a threshold from the house next door into this world, with another black figure behind her. (She is Johnson's sister.) An adult black woman looks out an upstairs window as she steadies a small light-skinned child sitting on the partially collapsed roof. The woman dancing with the child in the middle foreground has the darkest skin; nearly each individual is painted with a different skin tone.

These variations among "people of color" reflect African-American society of the Upper South, but also invite the viewer to contemplate the mixed racial ancestry of those portrayed. Several elements hint at or symbolize relations to an unseen wealthier white father—the mulatto children, the ladder from the Negro quarters up to a larger house next door and, symbolically, the rooster high in the tree near the taller house and hen on the Negroes' house roof. Both proponents and detractors of slavery perceived this painting as supporting their world views, because the Negroes seem cheerful enough, but their house is dilapidated.

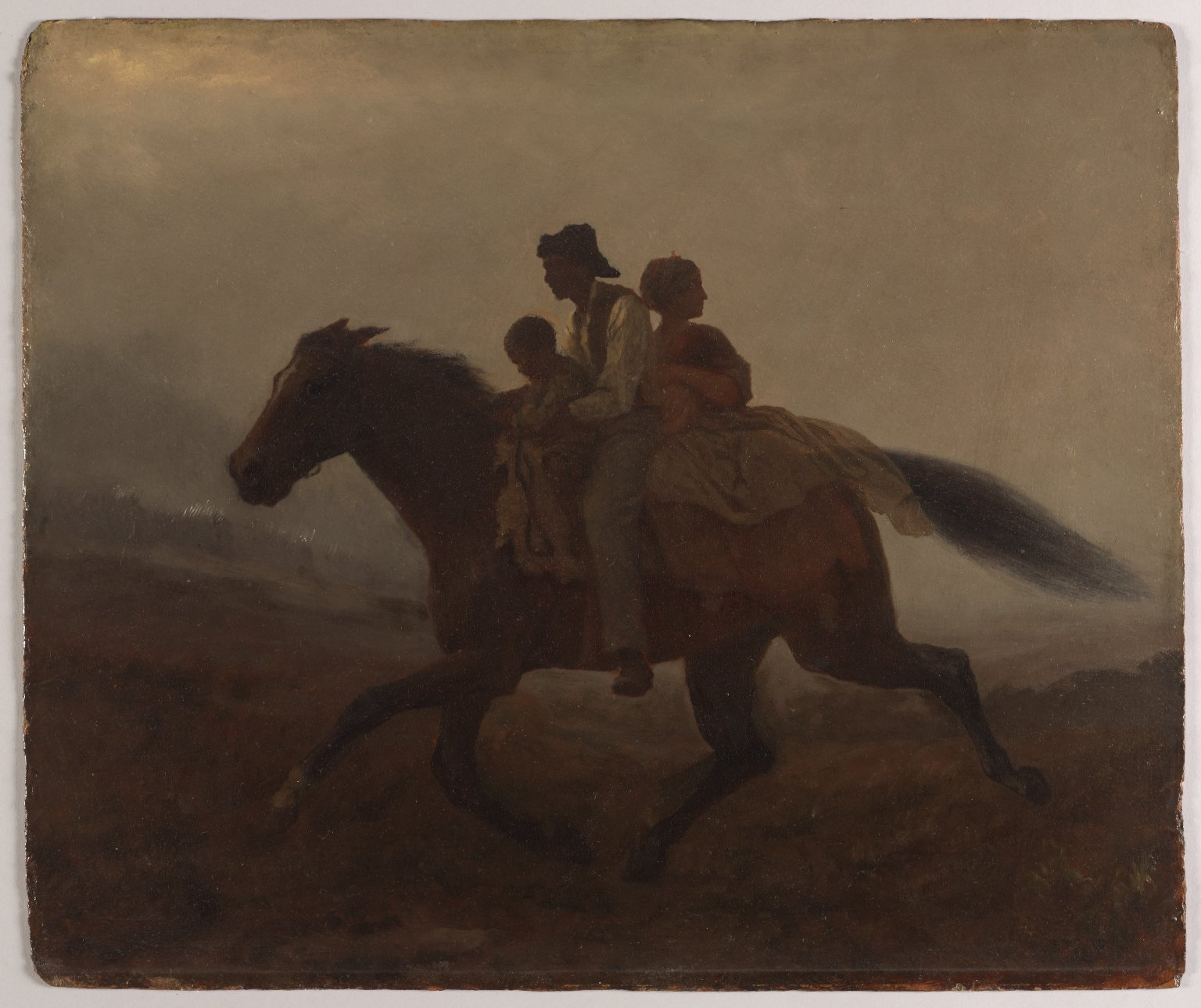
A Ride for Liberty – The Fugitive Slaves, oil on paperboard, ca. 1862, Brooklyn Museum

A Ride for Liberty – The Fugitive Slaves (1862), which depicts a slave family riding at dawn to freedom, also invites interpretation. Johnson places the slave family squarely in the center of the work, acting as agents of their own destiny. It appears to be dawn and in the distance is light on bayonets, indicating Union lines. A man rides with a child in front of him; behind him, a woman holds an infant close to her chest. She looks behind her as if worried about pursuers, or wondering what she left behind. Curator Eleanor Harvey writes the painting "captures the moment when the full scope of the slavery question begins to loom. Johnson placed these people squarely in the foreground and, in doing so, elevated their plight in the national debate."

Johnson noted at the time that the painting is based on his observations during the Civil War Battle of Manassas.

His work, The Lord is My Shepherd (1863), shows an African-American man reading from the Bible, presumably from Psalm chapter 23, given the name of Eastman's work. Here he sits against a blue jacket that may indicate service in the Union army. It was painted soon after the announcement of the Emancipation Proclamation, by which many blacks made their exodus from slavery to freedom. Reading was seen as key to the ability of freedmen to make progress.

== Gallery ==
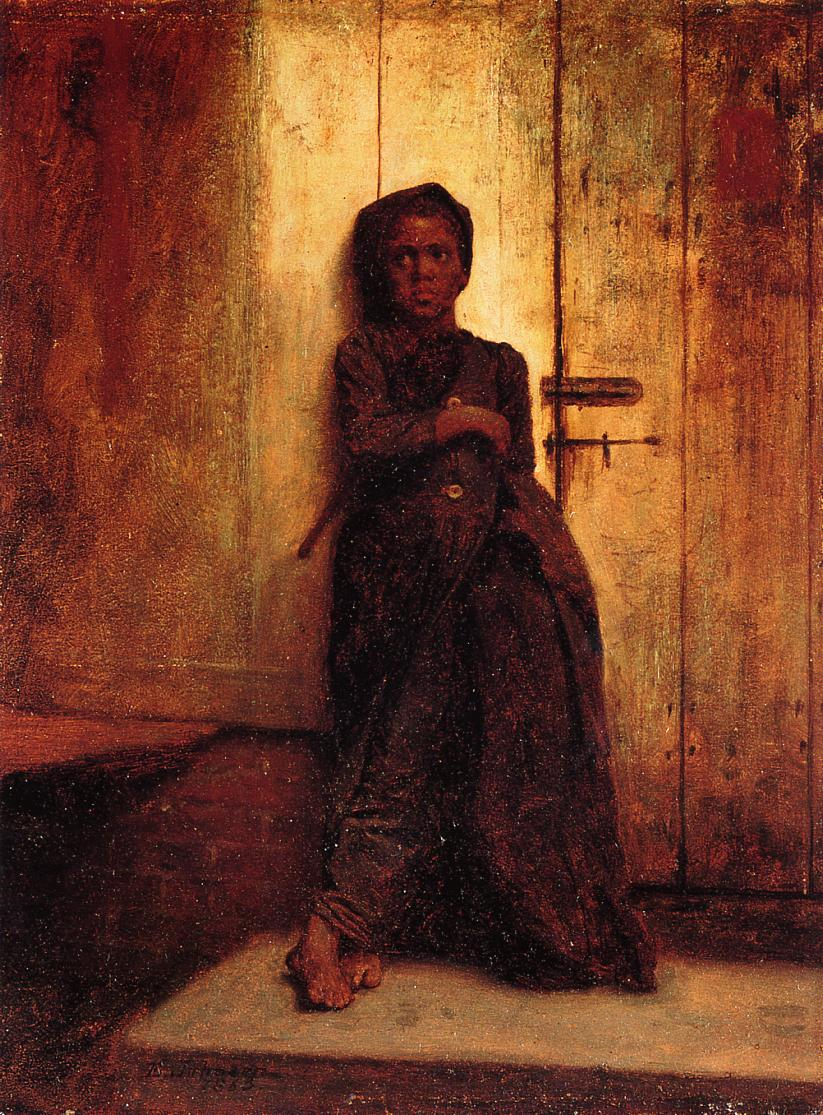
A Young Sweep, oil on canvas, 1863, 18 1/2 × 16 1/2 in. (47 × 41.9 cm) Detroit Institute of Arts

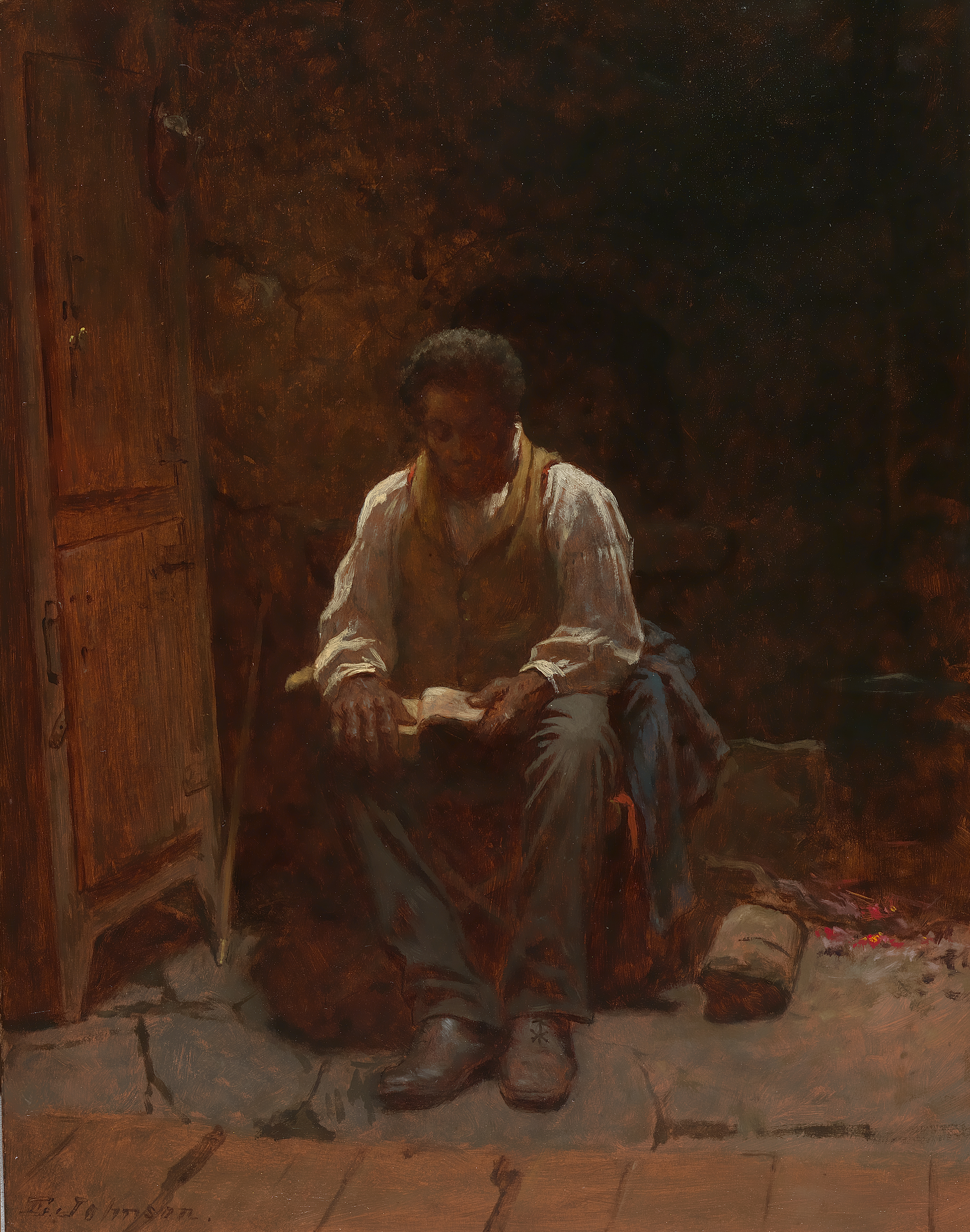
The Lord is My Shepherd, oil on canvas, c. 1863, 17 × 13 in. (42 × 33 cm) Smithsonian American Art Museum

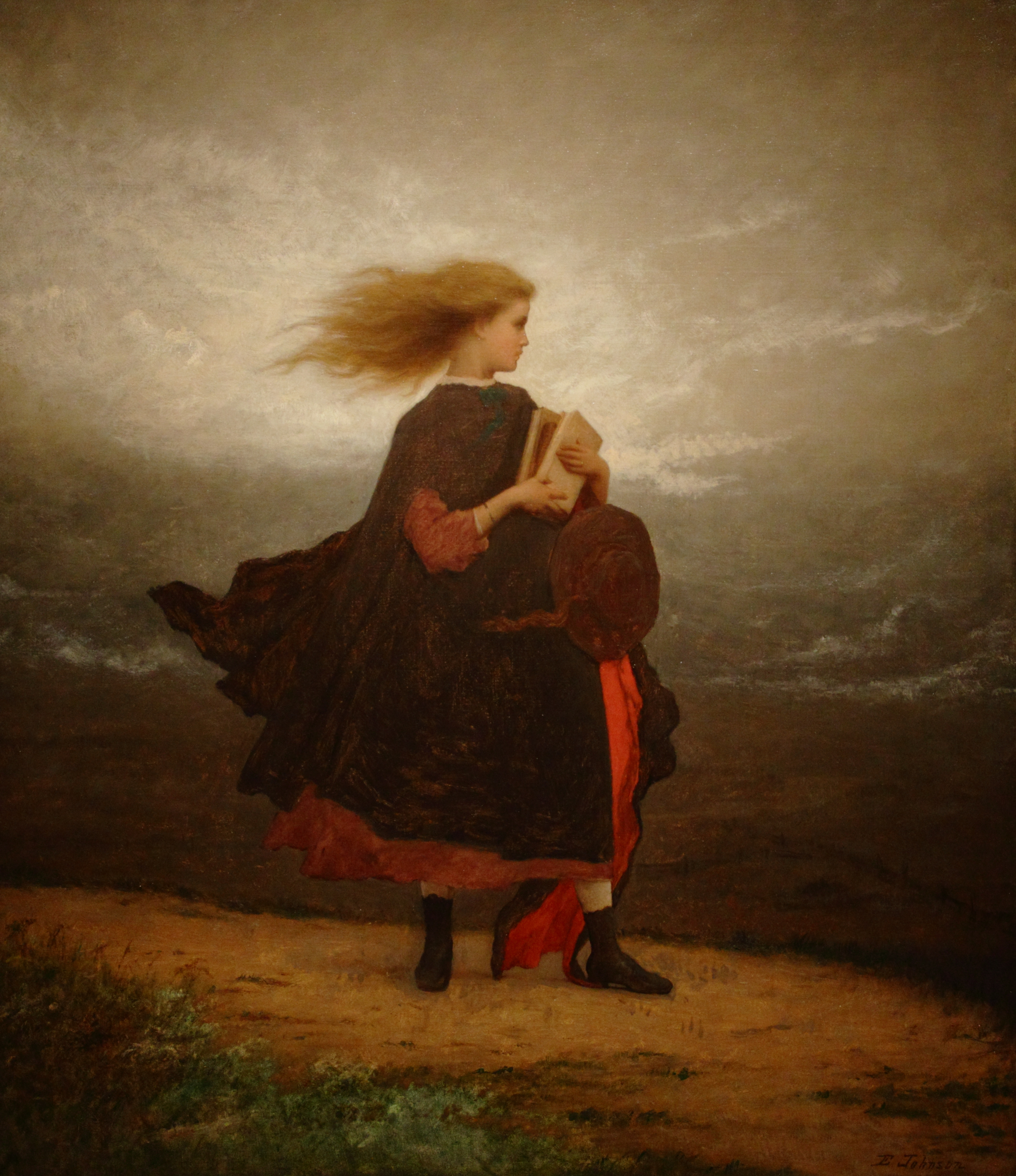
The Girl I Left Behind Me, oil on canvas, c. 1870–1875, 42 x 35 in., Smithsonian American Art Museum

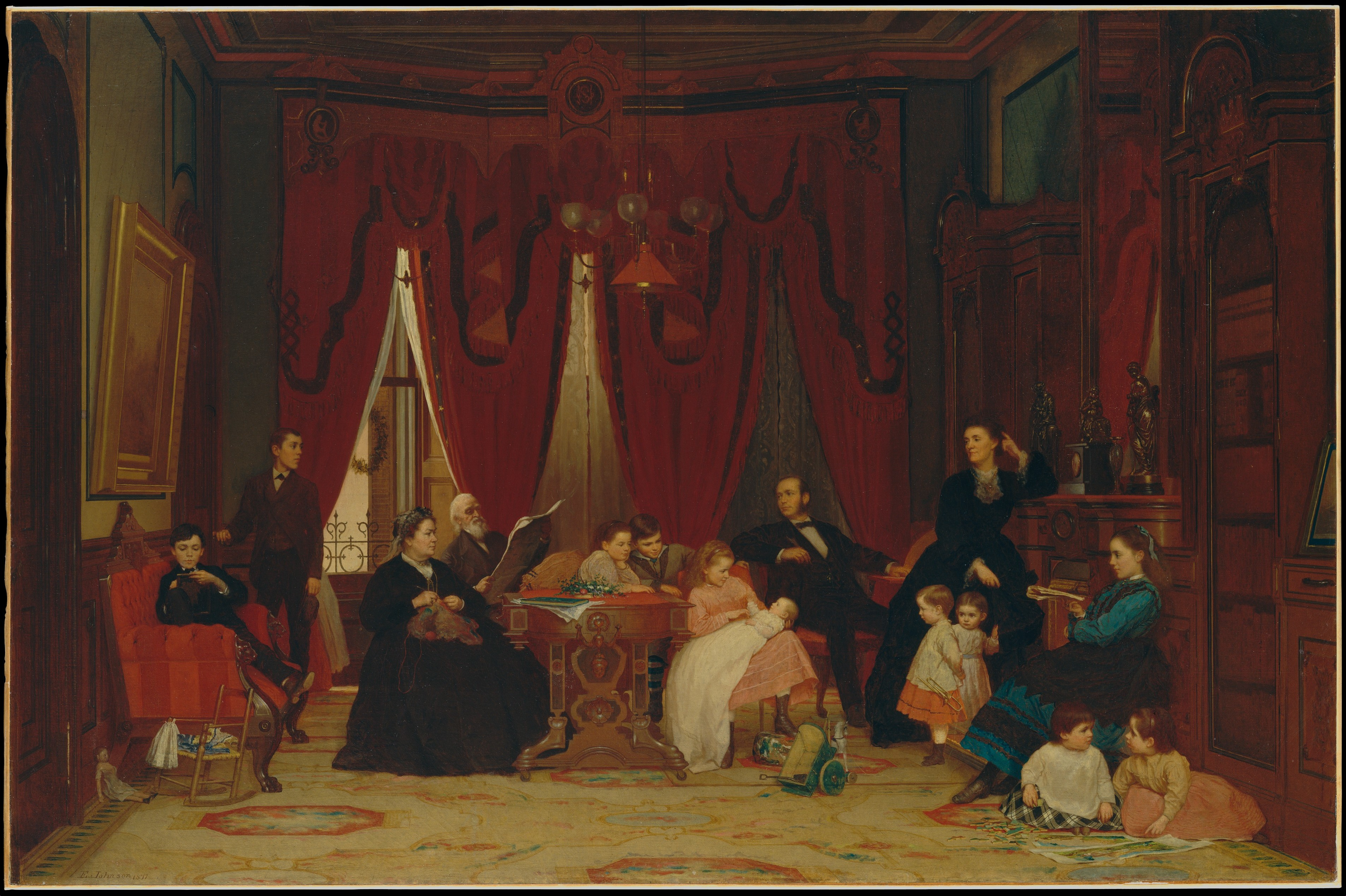
The Hatch Family, oil on canvas, c. 1870—1871, Metropolitan Museum of Art

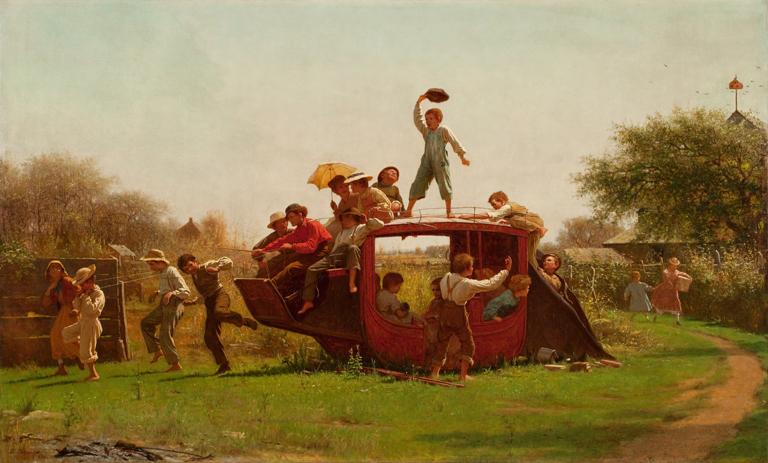
The Old Stagecoach, oil on canvas, 1871, Milwaukee Art Museum

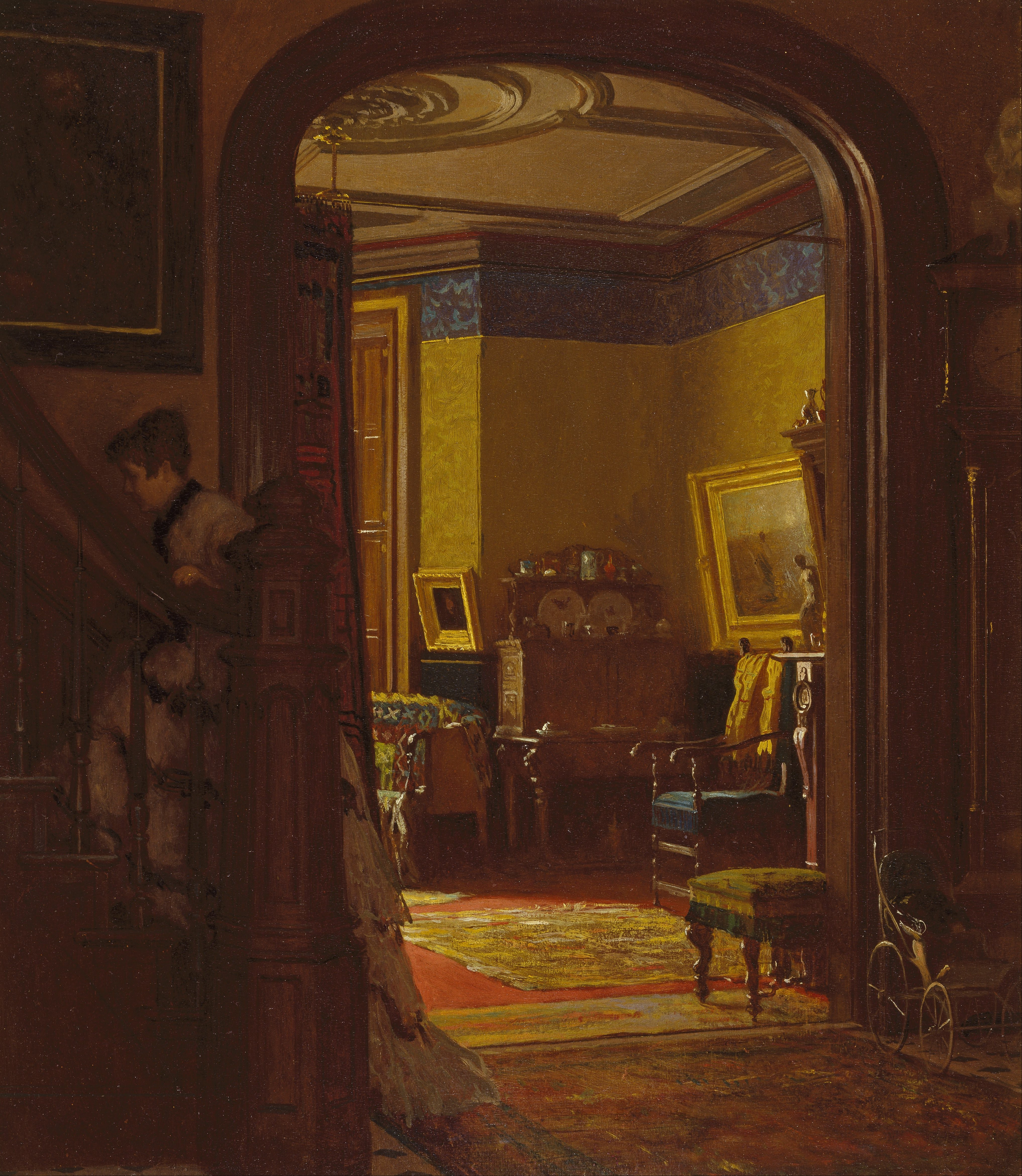
Not at Home (An Interior of the Artist's House) c. 1873. Brooklyn Museum

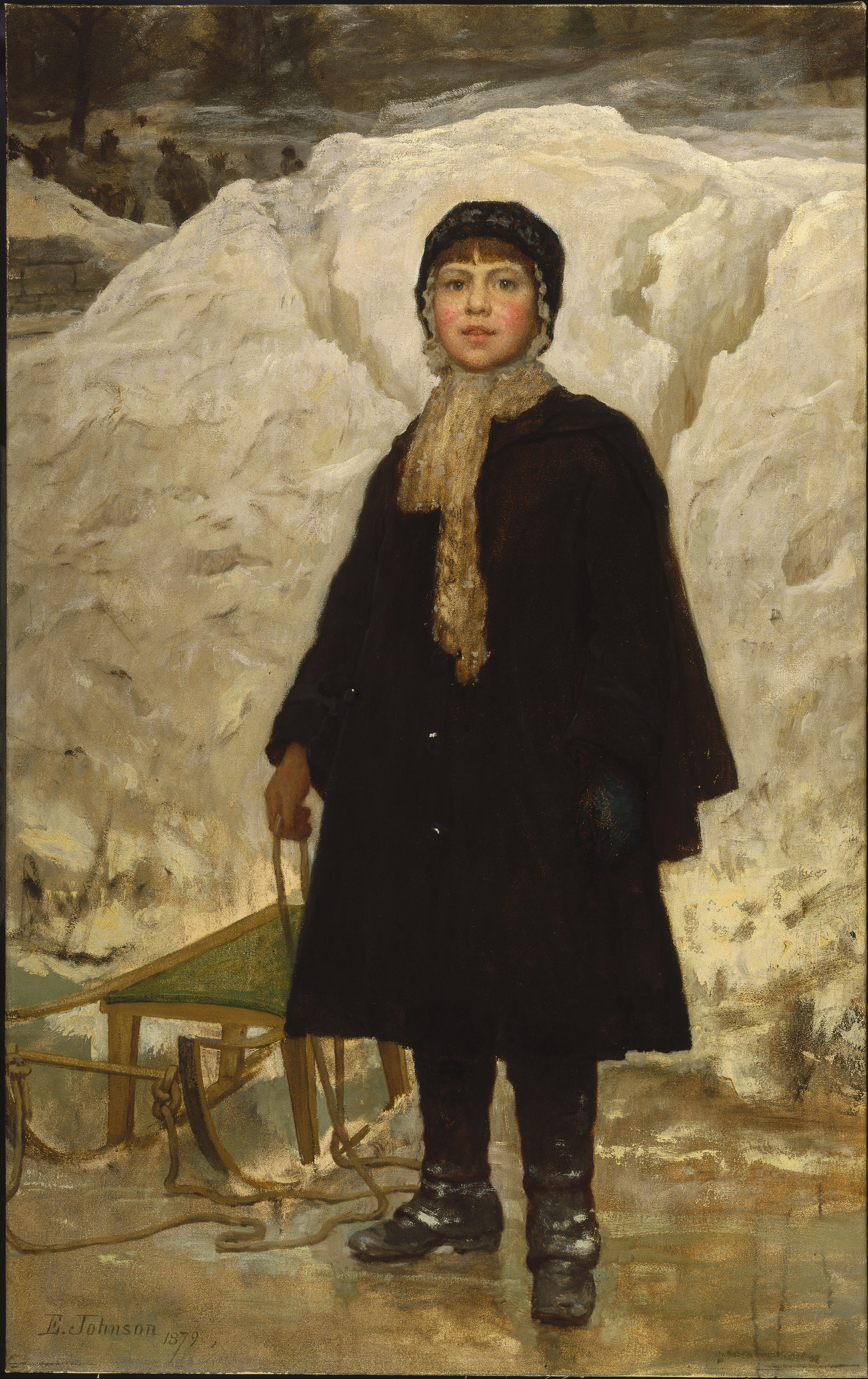
Winter, Portrait of a Child, 1879. Brooklyn Museum

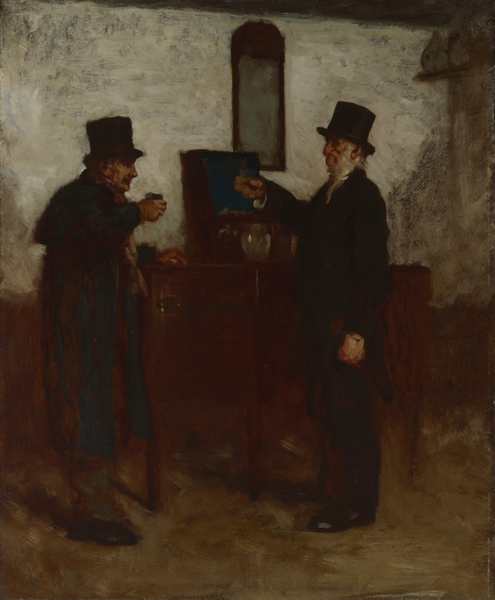
Study for A Glass with the Squire, 1880, Princeton University Art Museum

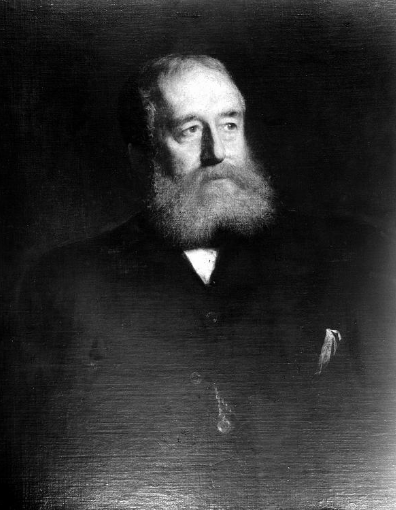
Joseph Wesley Harper, c. 1880

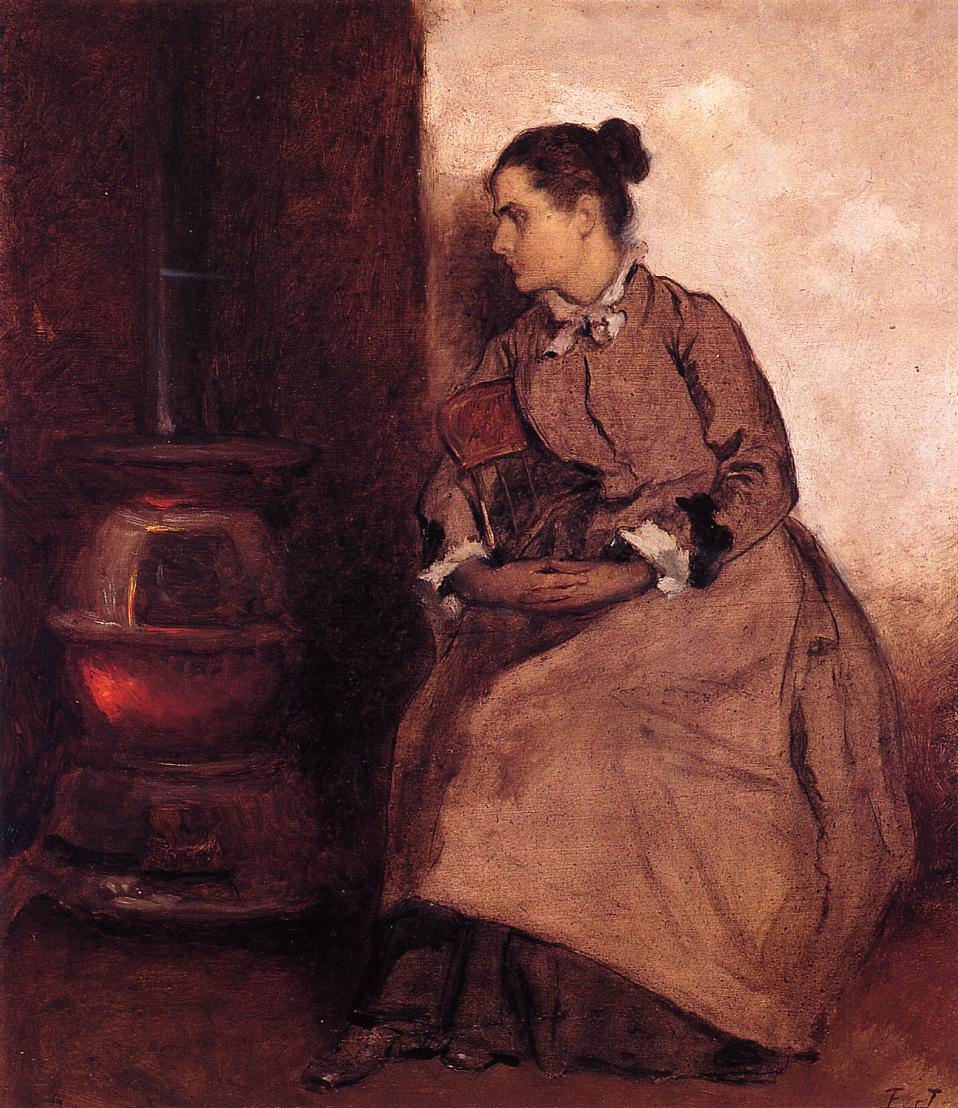
Ruth, oil on panel, 1880–1885, Albright-Knox Art Gallery

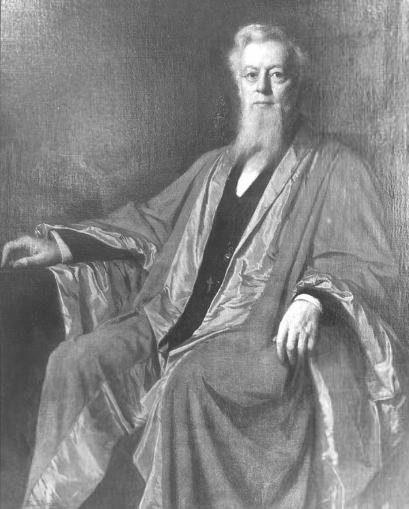
Frederick Augustus Porter Barnard, 1886

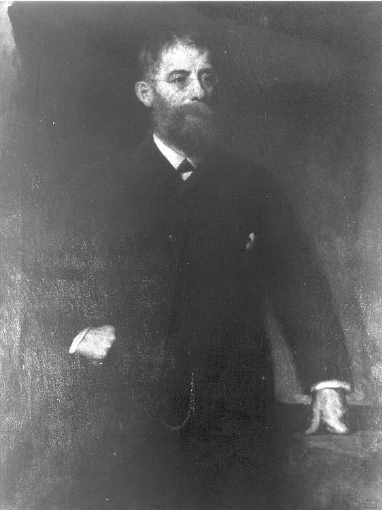
John Call Dalton, M.D., 1886

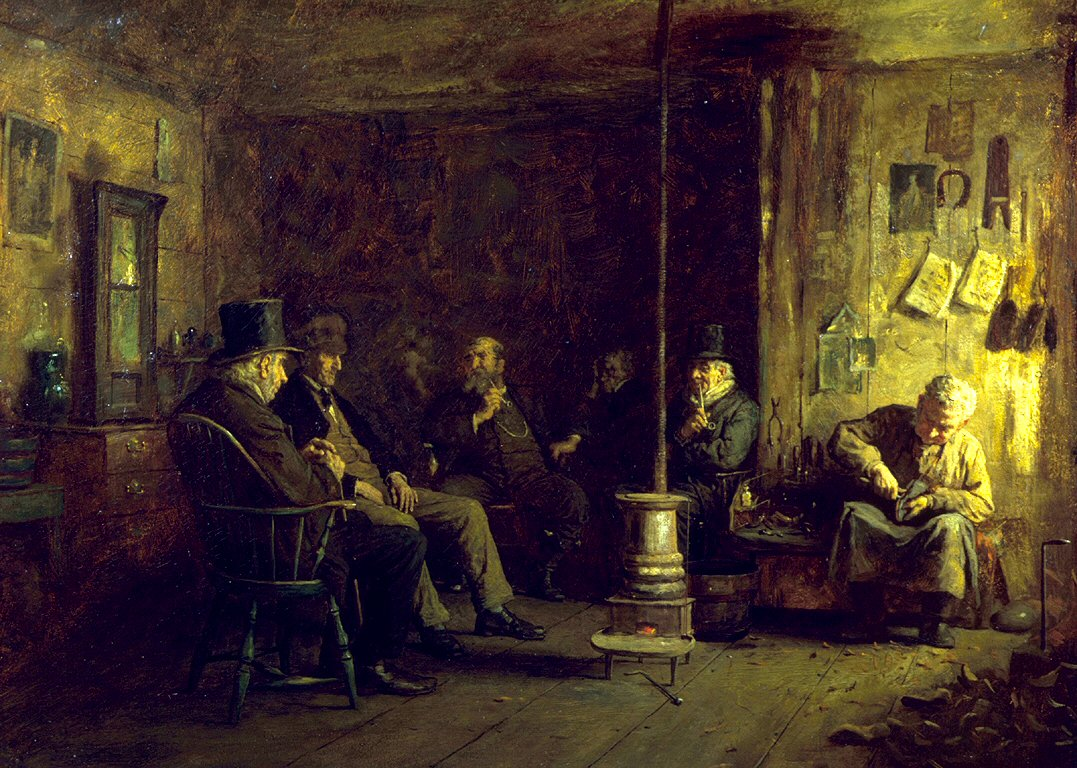
The Nantucket School of Philosophy, 1887. The Walters Art Museum

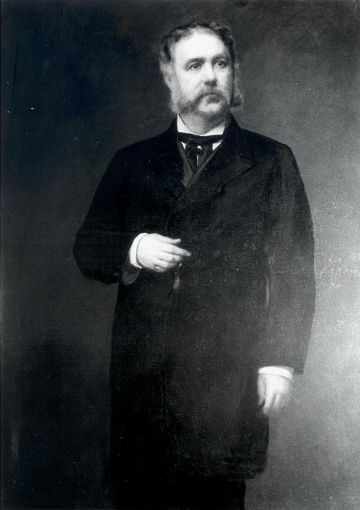
Chester Alan Arthur, 1887

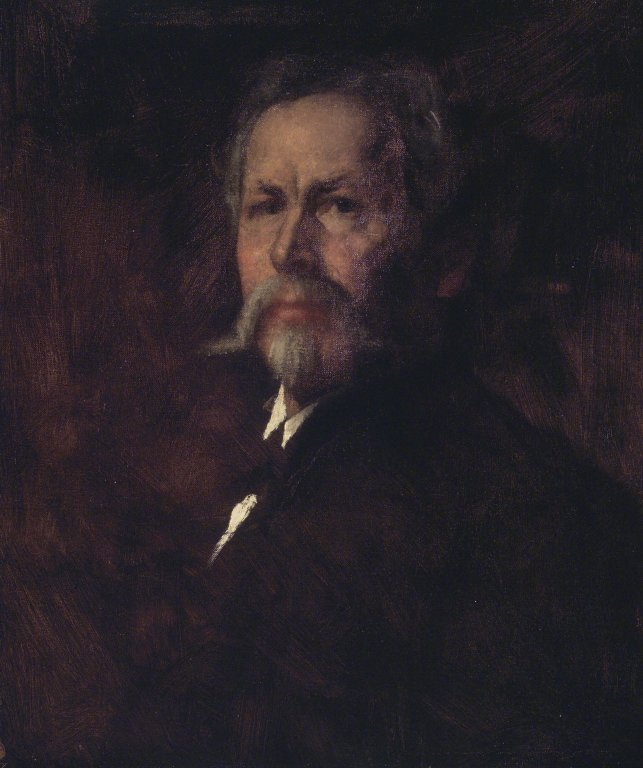
Self-portrait of Eastman Johnson, oil on canvas, c. 1890, Brooklyn Museum

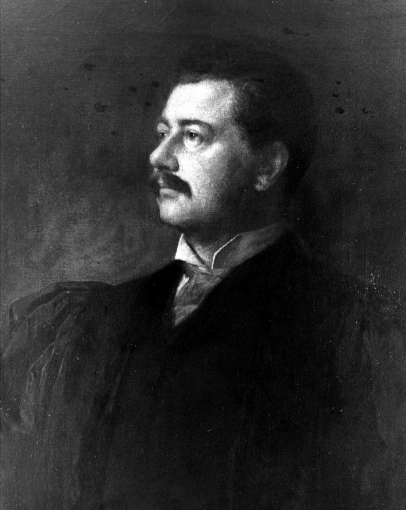
Seth Low, c. 1890

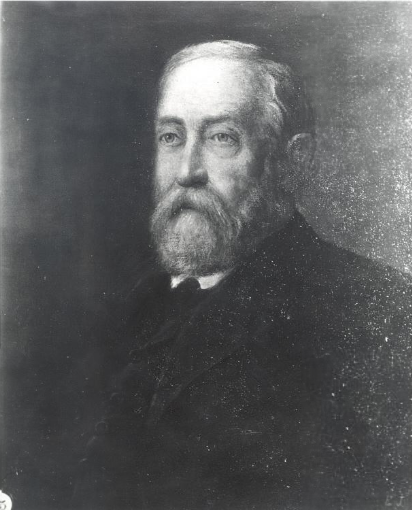
Benjamin Harrison, c. 1890–1900

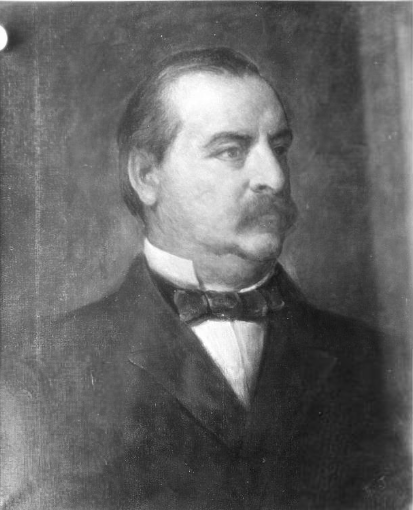
Stephen Grover Cleveland, c. 1890–1900

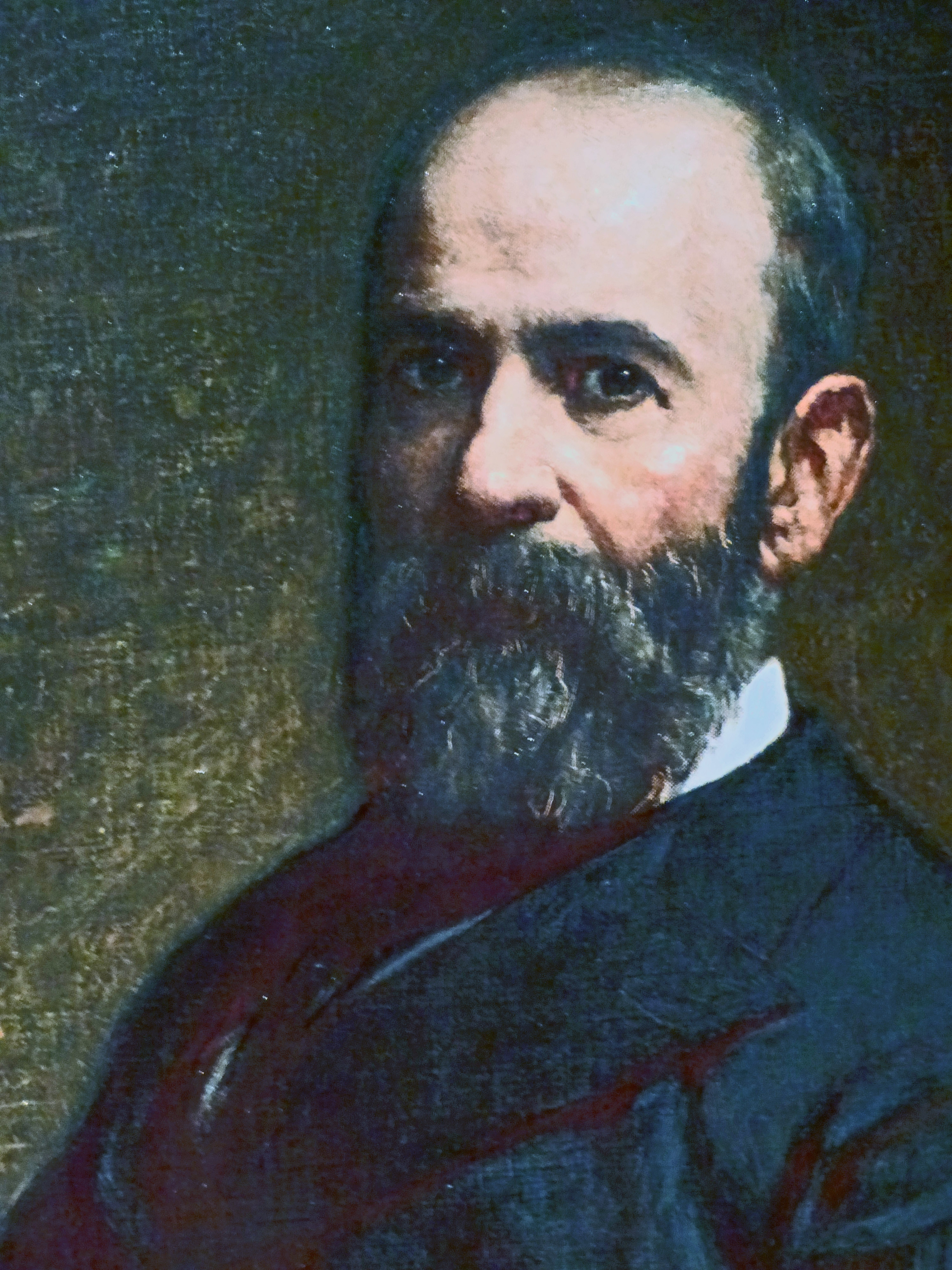
Jay Gould, 1896

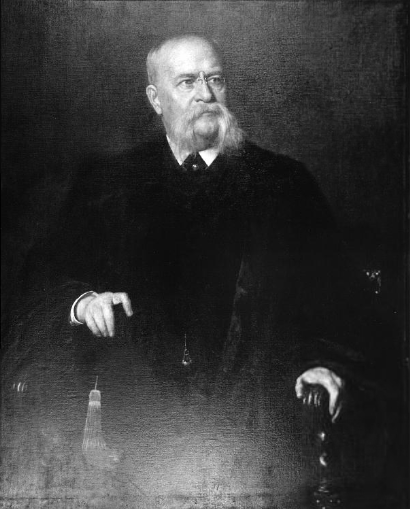
John Howard Van Amringe, 1900
