= Alfred Wilkinson Johnson =

US Navy vice-admiral (1876-1963)

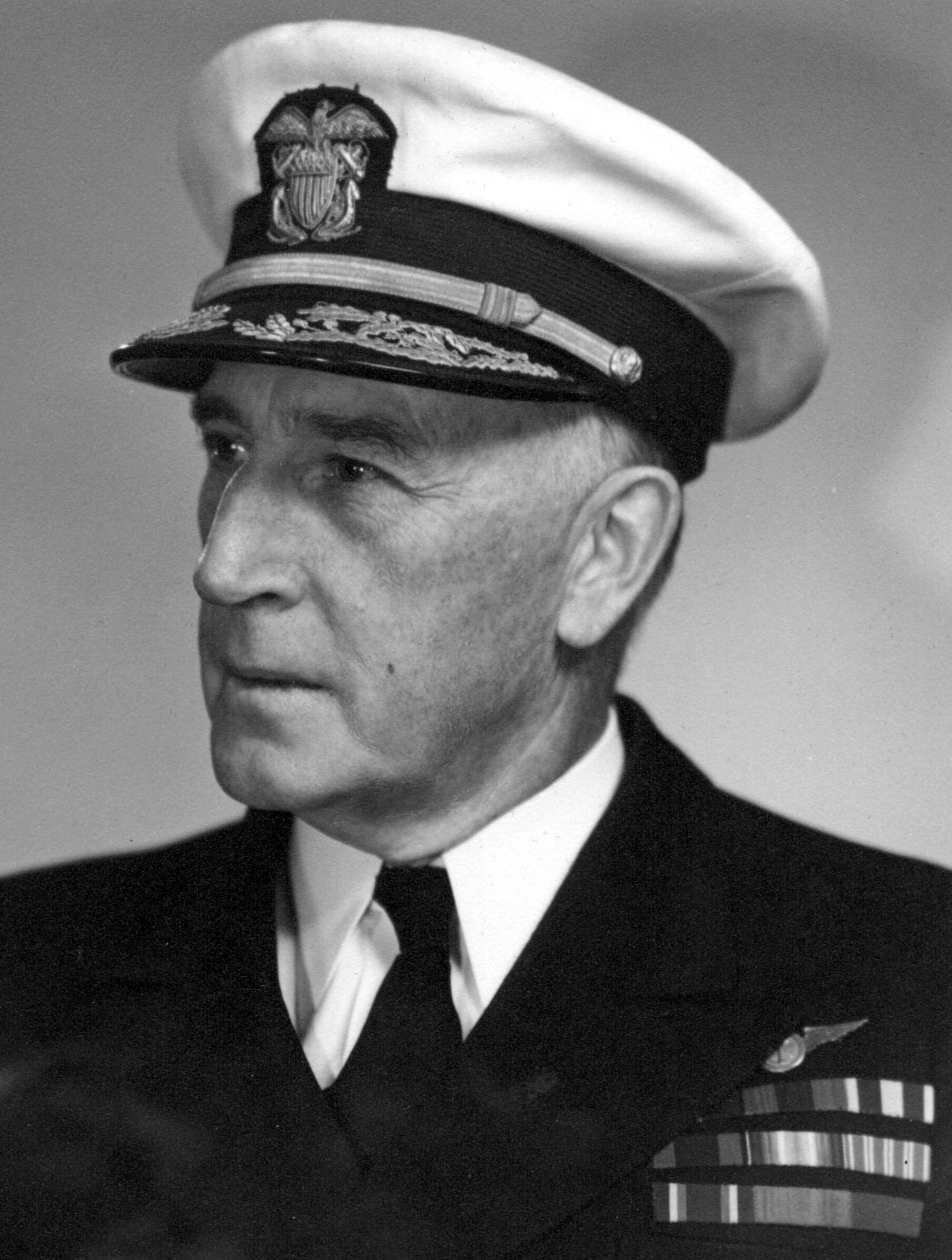
- Johnson as Vice Admiral
- Born: November 18, 1876; Philadelphia, Pennsylvania, U.S.
- Died: December 5, 1963 (aged 87); Washington, D.C., U.S.
- Burial place: Arlington National Cemetery
- Military career
- Allegiance: United States
- Branch: United States Navy
- Service years: 1895–1945
- Rank: Vice Admiral
- Commands: Conyngham (DD-58); Kimberly (DD-80); Richmond (CL-9); Director of Naval Intelligence; Colorado (BB-45); Bureau of Navigation; Fleet Patrol Plane Squadrons; Atlantic Squadron
- Conflicts: Spanish–American War; Philippine–American War; World War I; World War II
- Awards: Navy Distinguished Service Medal; Legion of Merit; Order of St. Michael and St. George (Great Britain); Order of the Bath, Companion (Great Britain); Medal of Merit, 1930 (Nicaragua); Order of the Liberator, Grand Official (Venezuela); Order of the Aztec Eagle, Mexico
- Other work: Envoy Extraordinary and Minister Plenipotentiary to Nicaragua, Inter-American Defense Board, U.S. Mexican Defense Commission, Permanent Board on Defense-Canada-U.S.

Alfred Wilkinson Johnson (November 18, 1876 – December 5, 1963) was a career officer of the United States Navy who served in the Spanish–American War and World War I, commanded several ships, and served as Director of Naval Intelligence, reaching the rank of Vice Admiral. He retired in December 1940.

Recalled to duty during World War II he served on several boards, finally retiring in August 1945. He died in 1963.

== Early life and education ==
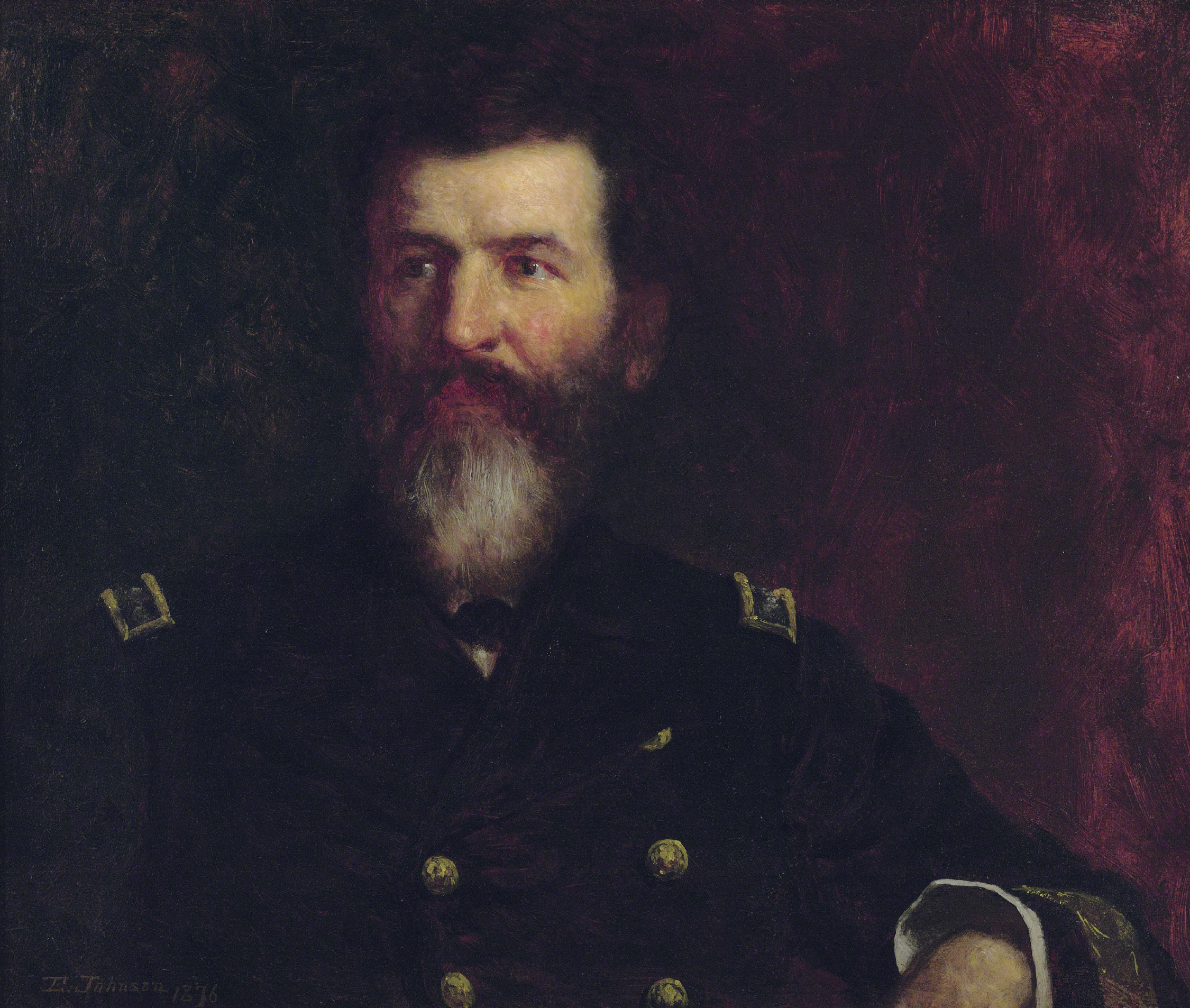
His father Philip Carrigan Johnson painted by his uncle Eastman Johnson in 1876

Johnson was born in Philadelphia on November 18, 1876, son of Philip Carrigan Johnson Jr. and his wife Elvira Lindsay. His father was a career US Naval officer, who reached the rank of Commodore, or Rear Admiral. Alfred was a nephew of American painter Eastman Johnson, who was a co-founder of the Metropolitan Museum of Art, New York City. Alfred grew up with his family on his father's assignments in California, Maine, and in the District of Columbia, where he attended public schools.

== Naval cadet ==
He followed his father into the Navy, being appointed Naval Cadet (at large) by President Grover Cleveland, and entered the United States Naval Academy at Annapolis, Maryland, in 1895.

During the Spanish–American War, as a member of the First Class, he served on Massachusetts (BB-2) of the North Atlantic Squadron under the command of Rear Admiral W.T. Sampson, USN and later on Detroit (C-10). He returned to Annapolis in September 1898, and was graduated in January 1899. Johnson served two years at sea, as then required by law before commissioning, and was commissioned Ensign in 1901.

== Junior officer ==
Johnson served successively on Newark (C-1), Texas (1892), Detroit (C-10), Kearsarge (BB-5), and had duty in the Philippines during the insurrection aboard New York (ACR-2). He returned to the United States in 1903. After duty on the monitors Puritan (BM-1) and Lancaster, he served on torpedo boats until 1907, commanding Rodgers (TB-4) and Wilkes (TB-35).

From 1907 until 1910, he served as an instructor in the Department of Mathematics at the Naval Academy, as part of a regular pattern of alternating sea and shore assignments. During this assignment he made the midshipman's practice cruise on Hartford (1858) in the summer of 1908, and served as flag lieutenant to the commander of the Practice Squadron on the flagship Olympia (C-6) in the summer of 1909.

Johnson joined Delaware (BB-28) as assistant engineer officer in 1910 and in 1911 was transferred to Nebraska (BB-14), with duty as senior Engineer Officer. Upon detachment, he reported to the Office of Naval Intelligence, Navy Department. From April 10, 1912, to December 13, 1913, Johnson served as US Naval Attaché to Santiago, Chile.

== Commanding officer ==
In 1914, after several months in command of the Benham (DD-49), Johnson was given charge of fitting out Downes (DD-45) at the New York Shipbuilding Company, Camden, New Jersey. He commanded the ship briefly before his transfer in 1915 to Conyngham (DD-58) at William Cramp and Sons, Philadelphia, Pennsylvania.

He assumed command of that destroyer when she was commissioned on January 21, 1916. Conyngham was in the first destroyer division sent to Europe in April 1917, when the United States entered World War I. He was based at Queenstown, Ireland. For his services in command of the Conyngham, Johnson was awarded the Distinguished Service Medal with citation as follows:

For exceptionally meritorious service in a duty of great responsibility as Commanding Officer of the USS Conyngham engaged in the important, exacting and hazardous duty of patrolling the waters infested with enemy submarines and mines, in escorting and protecting vitally important convoys of troops and supplies through these waters, and in offensive and defensive action, vigorously and unremittingly prosecuted against all forms of enemy naval activity; and especially for an attack upon an enemy submarine on October 19, 1917, during which attack Conyngham was directly over the submarine and dropped a depth bomb which is believed to have destroyed the submarine.

Johnson fitted out and commanded the destroyer Kimberly (DD-80) early in 1918. Upon his return to the United States later that year, he reported for duty as aide to the commandant, New York Navy Yard and Third Naval District.

He served as commander, Air Force, Atlantic fleet, while simultaneously commanding Shawmut and later Wright (AV-1), in 1920 and 1921. Planes under his command made the first flight across the Caribbean to Panama and in June–July 1921 were engaged in bombing experiments with ex-German warships off the Virginia Capes. In 1922 he served in the Bureau of Navigation, Navy Department, Washington, DC. He served as senior member of boards to (1) to revise the orders for gunnery and bombing exercises for aircraft and (2) to draw up a doctrine for aircraft in connection with fleet fire control.

He was assistant chief of the Bureau of Aeronautics from 1923 to late in 1925. In cooperation with the US Geological Survey, he initiated the Aerial Photographic Survey of Alaska and the Aleutian Islands by naval aircraft.

From January 1, 1926, to November 3, 1927, he commanded the cruiser Richmond (CL-9). After a tour of duty as Director of Naval Intelligence, Washington, D.C., he was appointed in June 1930, as President of the National Board of Elections in Nicaragua, with additional rank of Envoy Extraordinary and Minister Plenipotentiary to Nicaragua. (In this period, military officers served in diplomatic posts in South America.) For service rendered in the 1930 election, he received the Medal of Merit from the Government of Nicaragua.

== Flag officer ==
Johnson commanded the battleship Colorado (BB-45) in 1931 and was Assistant Chief of the Bureau of Navigation from January 9, 1932, to May 5, 1933. He was advanced to the rank of rear admiral in 1933 and, in that year, qualified as a Naval Aviation Observer.

From August 1933 until June 1935 he served as commander, Patrol Plane Squadrons, US Fleet. In January 1934, his squadrons made the first mass non-stop flight from the West Coast to Honolulu and to Midway Island. While in this command, he developed the patrol plane squadrons by conducting their operations away from home bases for extended periods of time in distant theaters of activity, to increase their usefulness to the fleet.

He was a member of the General Board from June 1935 to January 1938, when he assumed command of the Training Detachment, US Fleet. In October 1938, his title was changed to Commander, Atlantic Squadron. While in command of the Atlantic Squadron during the winter of 1938–1939, Admiral Johnson collaborated with the Naval Research Laboratory scientists in conducting the first comprehensive radar experiments at sea. These experiments resulted in developing the use of radar for fire control. The techniques proved useful during World War II.

In November 1939 Johnson reported for duty as a Member of the General Board. On December 1, 1940, having reached the age of retirement, he was transferred to the Retired List. He was advanced to the rank of Vice Admiral, in recognition of his being "specially commended for performance of duty in actual combat with the enemy during the World War".

== World War II ==
On January 1, 1942, after the United States entered World War II, Johnson was recalled to active duty. He served as US Naval Delegate to the Inter-American Defense Board from March 30, 1942, to August 1945, working to develop defenses in the western hemisphere. During this period, he had additional duty as Naval Member on the Joint Mexican-United States Defense Commission and as Senior Naval Member of the Permanent Joint Board on Defense, Canada-United States. He was awarded the Legion of Merit.

His citation states:

... Vice Admiral Johnson rendered invaluable assistance to all members of the Board during the early stages of hostilities and, by his superb ability and tact, was in large measure responsible for securing rights and privileges vitally needed by our forces in the conduct of the war and for the maintenance of cordial relations between the United States and Latin American countries...

Johnson retired on August 13, 1945, after forty-nine-and-a-half years of service.

== Personal life ==
On June 18, 1903, at Albany, New York, he married Hannah Cox Harris, daughter of Frederick Harris and his wife. She was a granddaughter of New York State Senator Hamilton Harris and a great-niece of U.S. Senator Ira Harris. They had two daughters, Caroline Gilbert and Elvira Lindsay Johnson.

Hannah Johnson died in 1962. Johnson died on December 5, 1963, and was buried at Arlington National Cemetery. They were survived by their daughters and their families: Caroline had married James Elwyn Brown, who became a US diplomat, and Elvira married Charles Burke Elbrick, who became an ambassador.
