= Negro Life at the South =

1859 painting by Eastman Johnson

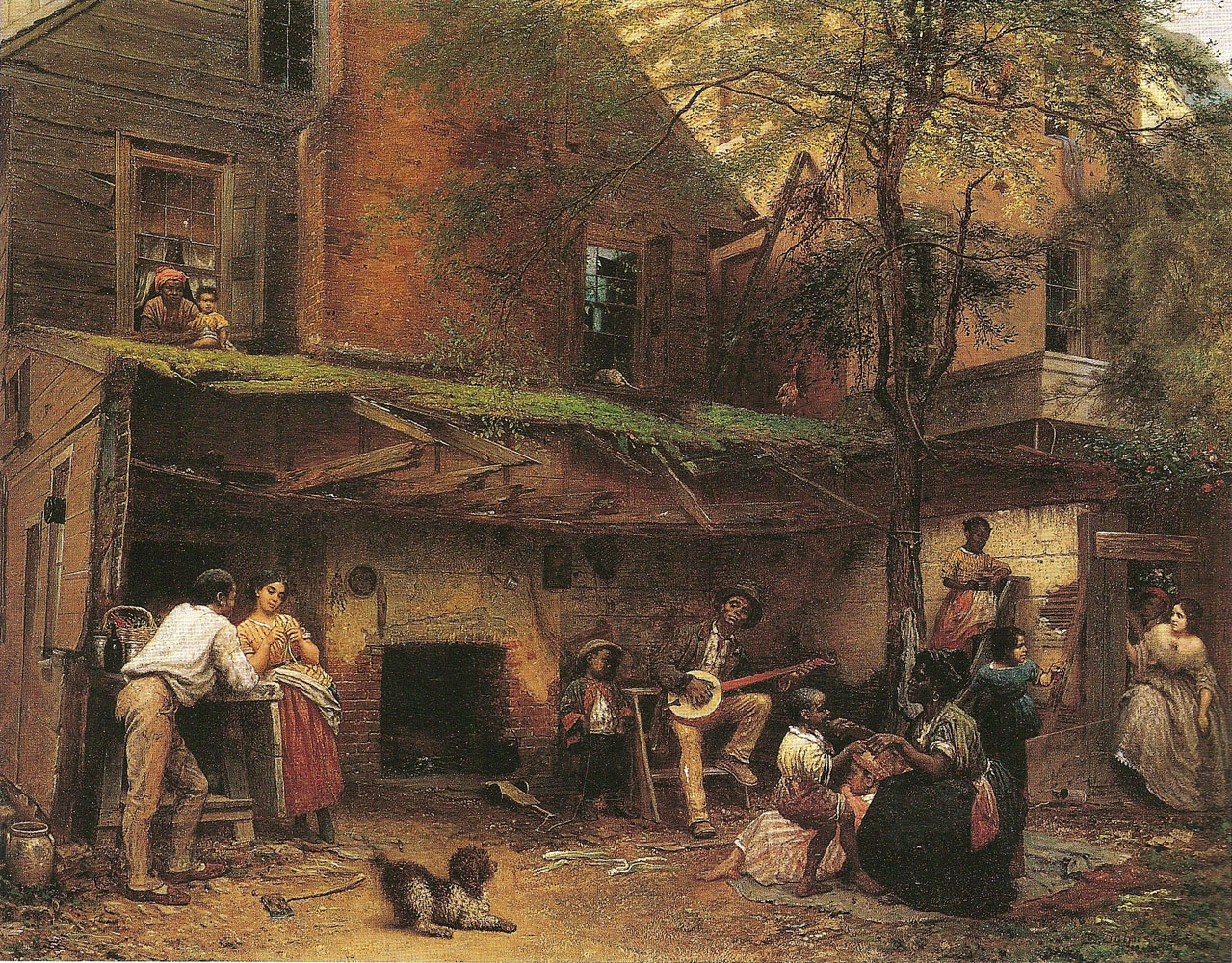
- Negro Life at the South
- Artist: Eastman Johnson
- Year: 1859
- Medium: Oil on linen
- Dimensions: 94 cm × 116.8 cm (37 in × 46.0 in)
- Location: New-York Historical Society, New York
- Owner: The Robert L. Stuart Collection

Negro Life at the South (1859) is a painting by American artist Eastman Johnson that depicts the private life of African-American slaves in Washington, D.C. It was painted in Washington, D.C., and is now owned by the New York Public Library, on permanent loan to the New-York Historical Society. Johnson also created two versions of the painting in the 1870s, now owned by the High Museum of Art in Atlanta.

== The painting ==
Negro Life at the South is considered Johnson's masterpiece, and it gained attention at its first exhibit among more than 800 works at the National Academy of Design in New York City in 1859. There were numerous accounts in newspapers. The first review noted the painting was set in Washington, D.C., but it soon became popularly known as Old Kentucky Home, after Home Journal used this title in a feature article about it. Subsequent coverage mostly overlooked that Johnson's painting was of an urban "back street" scene from Washington, D.C., believed to be next to the home of Johnson's father.

The painting is a domestic scene behind a dilapidated house; to the right is a house in better condition. On the left in the foreground is a young couple courting, of which the woman is light-skinned; in the middle, a banjo player makes music while a boy watches, and an adult woman dances with a child, as others look on. At the right edge, a young white woman in a refined white dress is stepping over a threshold into "black life in the interior of a city block." Behind her is another black figure. The white woman may represent Johnson's sister.

An adult black woman looks out an upstairs window as she steadies a small mixed race child sitting on the partially collapsed roof. The darkest skin belongs to the woman dancing with the child in the middle foreground. The skin color variations, with nearly each individual shown as a different "person of color", reflected African-American society, but may also have been intended to invite the viewer to contemplate the mixed racial ancestry of those portrayed. Several elements hint at or symbolize relations to an unseen, wealthier white male—the mulatto children, the ladder from the Negro quarters leaning against a larger house next door (although not near any door or window) and, symbolically, the rooster high in the tree near the taller house and hen on the Negroes' house roof as well as the white cat, a tomcat perhaps, crawling in the bedroom window.

Its seemingly contradictory elements have implications that have been interpreted at length. The painting was interpreted by both proponents and detractors of slavery as supporting their position. Southerners associated it with plantation life and noted that the Negroes seemed cheerful in their leisure time. Northerners might concentrate on the top half of the painting, with the dilapidated roof representing the degradation of slavery and the light-skinned woman and child suggesting a theme of miscegenation.
