= Layton Art Gallery =

Art Museum in Milwaukee, Wisconsin

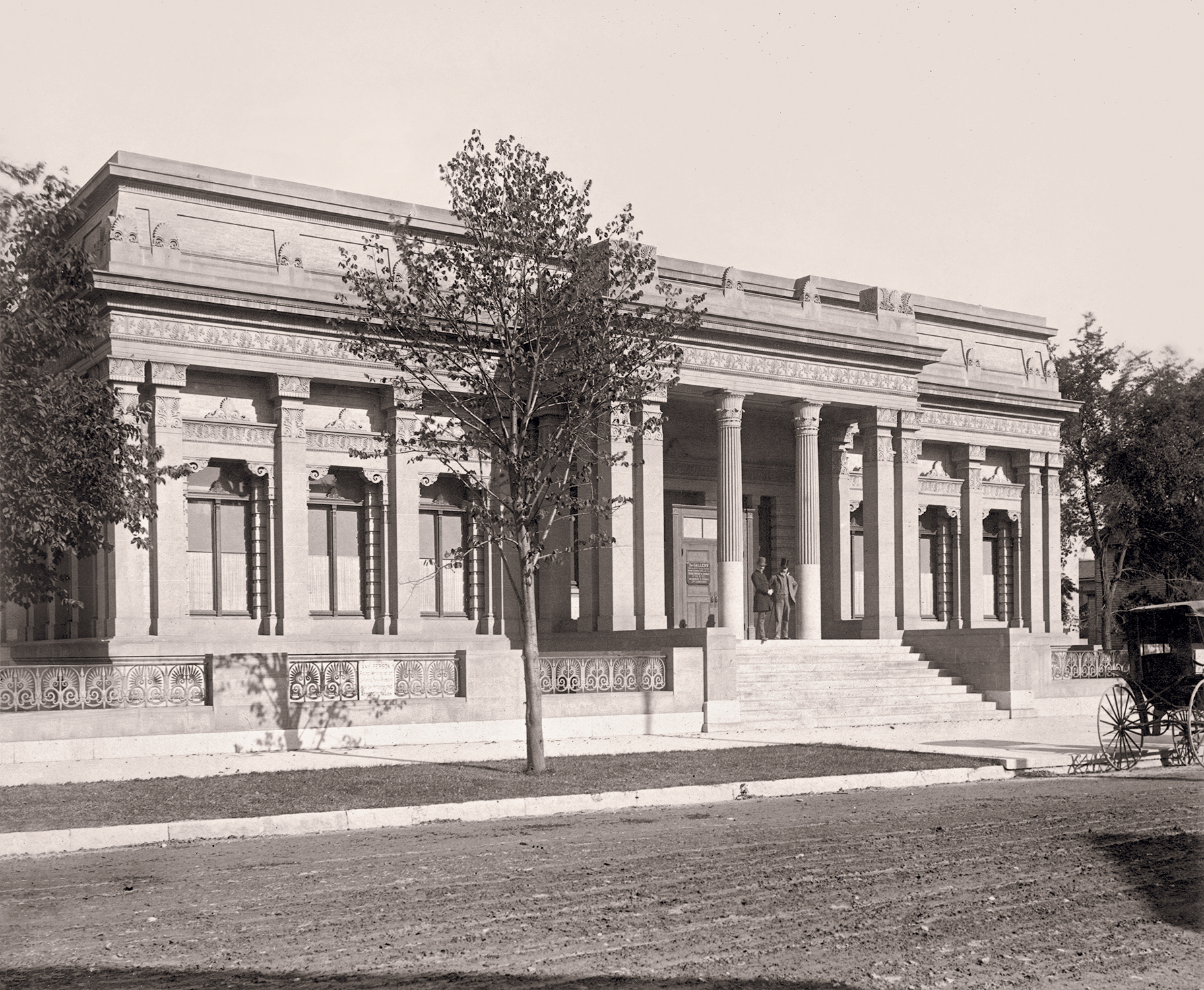
- The gallery shortly after its opening in 1888
- Interactive fullscreen map
- Established: April 5, 1888; 138 years ago
- Dissolved: 1957; 69 years ago
- Location: 758 N Jefferson Street; Milwaukee, Wisconsin; United States
- Coordinates: 43°2′25.55″N 87°54′18.92″W
- Type: Art museum

The Layton Art Gallery is a defunct art museum in Milwaukee, Wisconsin. Built at the initiative of British-American businessman Frederick Layton, the gallery was inaugurated in 1888 as the first public art institution in the city. Its one-story building, designed in the Greek Revival style by Scottish architect George Ashdown Audsley, stood at the corner of Mason and Jefferson streets, in downtown Milwaukee. The bulk of the gallery's works consisted of Layton's personal collection of European and American paintings and sculpture, assembled during the five years preceding the institution's opening, as well as subsequent purchases through an endowment.

Following Layton's death, art educator Charlotte Partridge opened the Layton School of Art in the basement of the gallery, a decision originally met with opposition from part of the public. Nevertheless, the school operated on site until 1951, when it relocated to a new building in the East Side district of Milwaukee. In 1957, the Layton Art Gallery merged with another institution, the Milwaukee Art Institute, to form the future Milwaukee Art Museum, housed in the County War Memorial designed by architect Eero Saarinen. The vacant Audsley building was razed in fall of that year. The original Layton Art Collection was entrusted to the new museum yet has remained under the purview of a distinct board of trustees since then.

== History ==
=== Origins ===
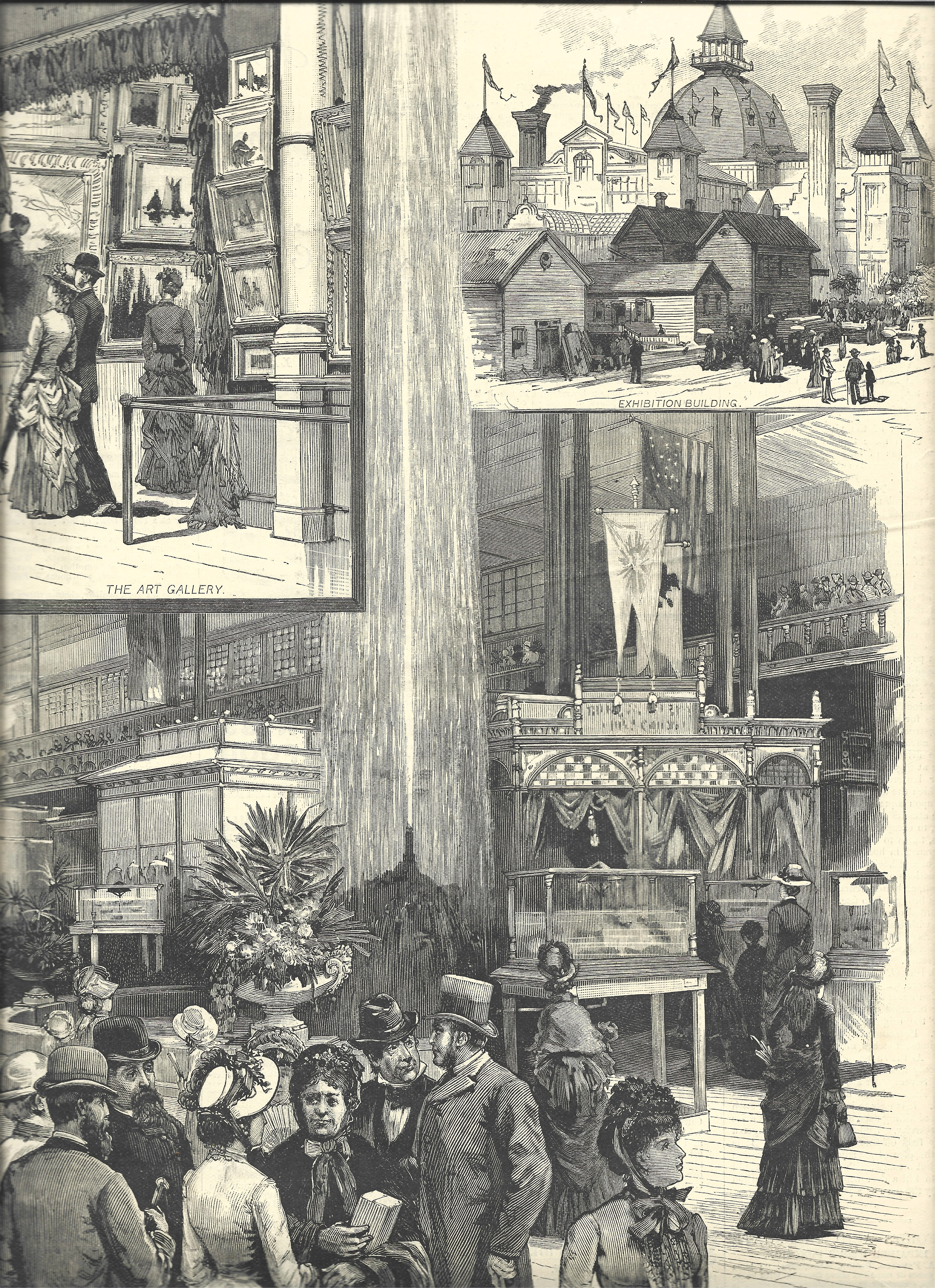
Milwaukee Exposition Building, Harper's Weekly, October 4, 1884

Beginning in the 1870s, the idea of establishing a public art gallery was increasingly supported by Milwaukee's city leaders, along with the need for a permanent exhibition venue. Significant artworks in town were mostly confined to private residences, including the homes of collectors Martha Reed Mitchell and William H. Metcalf. Occasional attempts were made to provide a permanent venue for the display of art, including with the construction of the Milwaukee Industrial Exposition Building. Inaugurated in 1881,the structure was modeled after London's Crystal Palace and Philadelphia's Centennial Exposition's Main Building, and hosted annual exhibitions of art and industry. The building was destroyed by fire on June 4, 1905. Its ruins were razed and replaced by the Milwaukee Auditorium in 1909.

According to a story reprised by Frederick Layton himself, he and railroad magnate Alexander Mitchell took part in a dinner at the Milwaukee Club in 1883 to celebrate their imminent departure to Europe, upon which Layton commented that an art gallery was needed for the city of Milwaukee. Word spread quickly, with Layton called on the next day by a reporter about his plans to build the structure. Soon, the Milwaukee Sentinel reported that Layton "was now going abroad and intends studying the architecture and management of art institutes while there and hoped to pick up some information that would be of value in the construction of a model building." The information was reprinted in national newspapers such as The New York Times, persuading Layton to act on it.

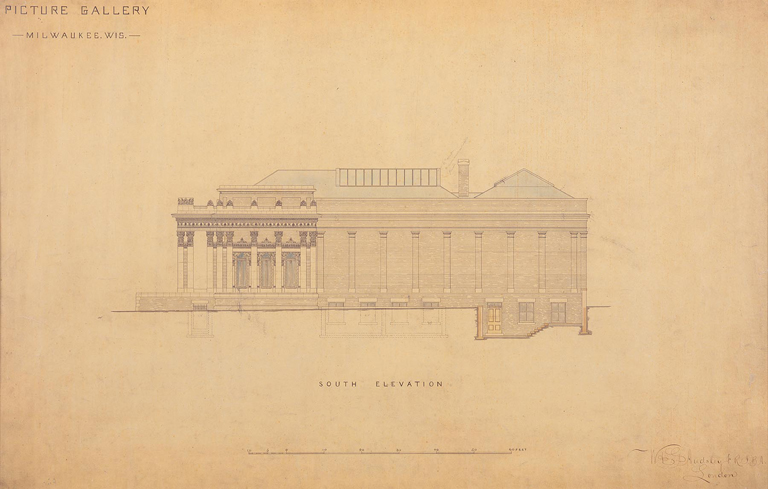
One of Audsley's designs for the Layton Art Gallery, c. 1885

While abroad, Layton hired George Ashdown Audsley, a Liverpool-based architect, to design plans for gallery building. Milwaukee architect Edward Townsend Mix worked jointly with his British counterpart to carry out the construction. The resulting design was a single-story top-lit gallery that differed from many other American gallery designs of the period, instead directly inspired by British galleries, including the Walker Art Gallery in Liverpool, the Dulwich Picture Gallery in London, and the Fitzwilliam Museum in Cambridge. The gallery's entrance was designed as a grand portico of simplified fluted Corinthian columns, with a frieze and facade ornaments made of terracotta, while the three remaining exterior walls were to be built using local Cream City brick. The project broke ground in October 1885.

Meanwhile, when collecting works of art, Layton sought out a range of popular artists of his time. He attended the New York estate sales of Alexander Turney Stewart and Mary J. Morgan, at which he purchased landscape scenes by painters John Constable and Régis François Gignoux, then crossed the Atlantic to pursue his acquisitions in Europe. A great number of Layton's purchases came from fine art dealer Arthur Tooth & Sons in London.

=== Museum development and creation of the Layton School of Art ===
The Layton Art Gallery was officially inaugurated on April 5, 1888. The total cost for construction amounted to $115,000 (roughly $3.8 million in 2025 dollars, adjusted for inflation), to which Layton added a $100,000 endowment for the purchase of art and care of the building.

Among artists represented in Layton's inaugural gift were painters William-Adolphe Bouguereau, James Tissot, and Eastman Johnson (The Old Stagecoach, 1871). Over the next decades, purchases and gifts from local collectors including Frederick Pabst, Philip Danforth Armour, Edward Phelps Allis, Patrick Cudahy, William Plankinton, John Lendrum Mitchell, and the Vogel family brought in works by Winslow Homer, Jules Bastien-Lepage (Le Père Jacques, 1881), Frederic Leighton, Albert Bierstadt, Lawrence Alma-Tadema, Thomas Moran, Abbott Handerson Thayer, Mihály Munkácsy, and Sofonisba Anguissola. In 1893, Italian sculptor Gaetano Trentanove, a participant to the World's Columbian Exposition held in Chicago, completed a bust of Layton, while his entry into the world's fair, a marble sculpture titled The Last of the Spartans, was acquired for the gallery.

The gallery's first curators were portraitist Edwin C. Eldridge and, as of 1902, the Sheboygan-born George Raab, a former student of German painter Richard Lorenz. In 1922, three years after Layton's death, art educator Charlotte Partridge took the reins of the gallery and of the Layton School of Art housed in the building. She rehung the collection and allowed drawing classes to be held within the galleries, while promoting modernist art and design. Architect Frank Lloyd Wright presented a retrospective of his work at the Layton Art Gallery in November 1930 and in the midst of the Great Depression, the Federal Art Project of the Works Progress Administration, under the supervision of Holger Cahill, helped the institution acquire works by contemporary Wisconsin painters.

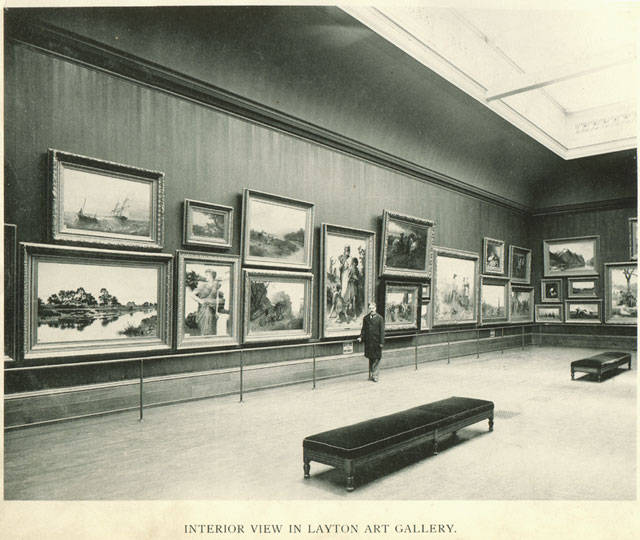
Interior view in 1895

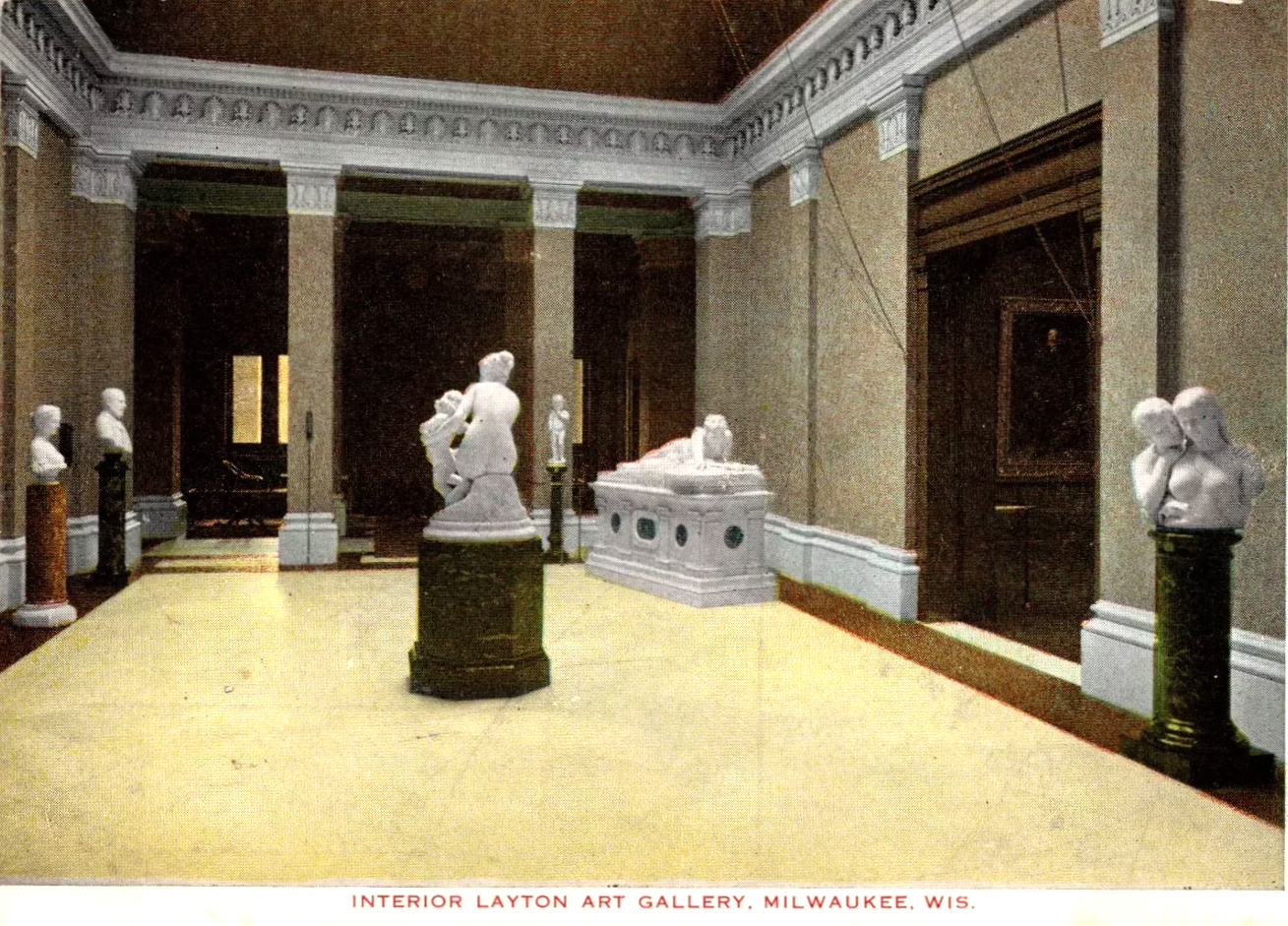
The sculpture gallery around 1908

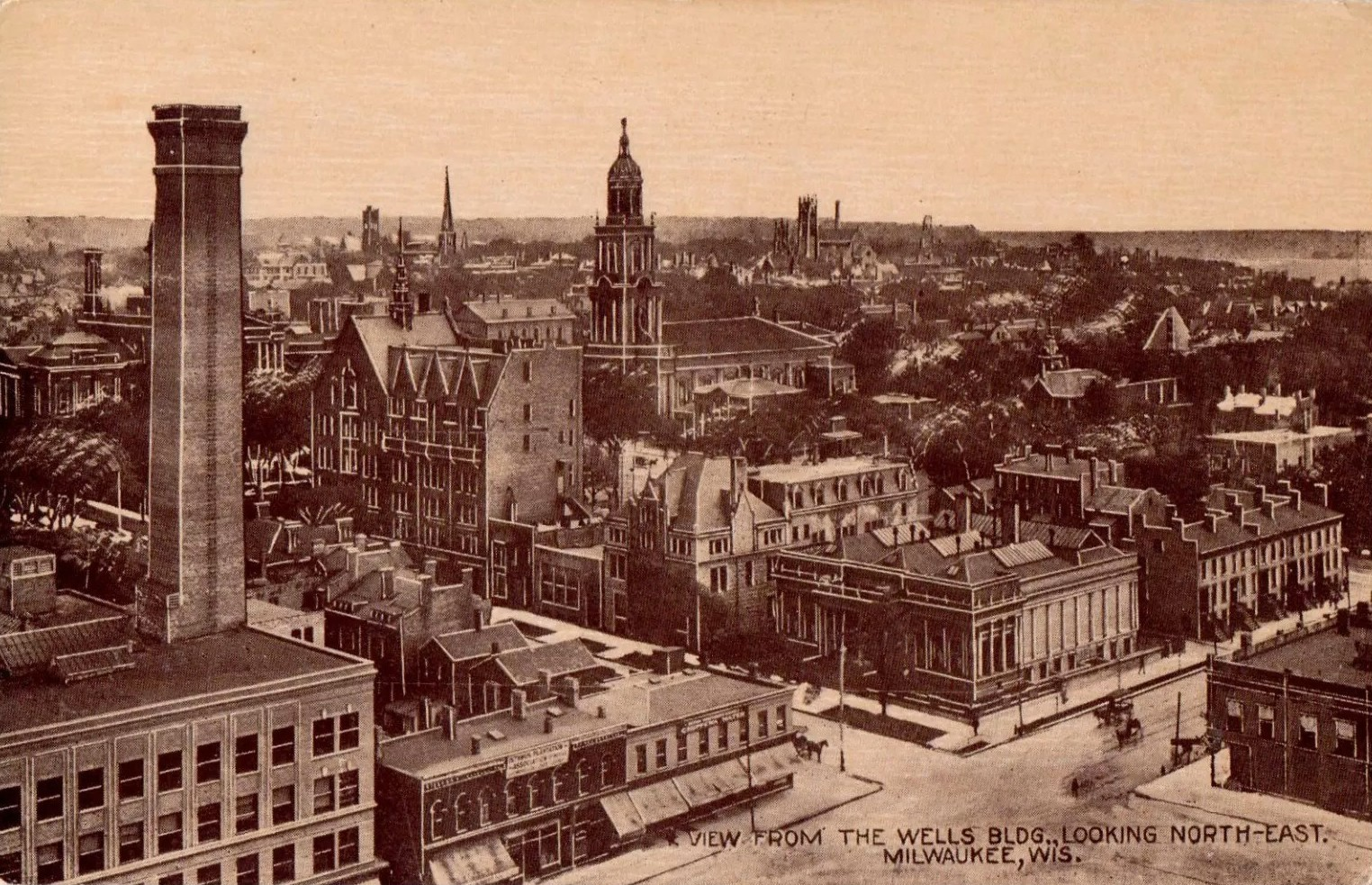
Corner of Jefferson and Mason St in 1910. The gallery building stands in the foreground.

=== Later years ===
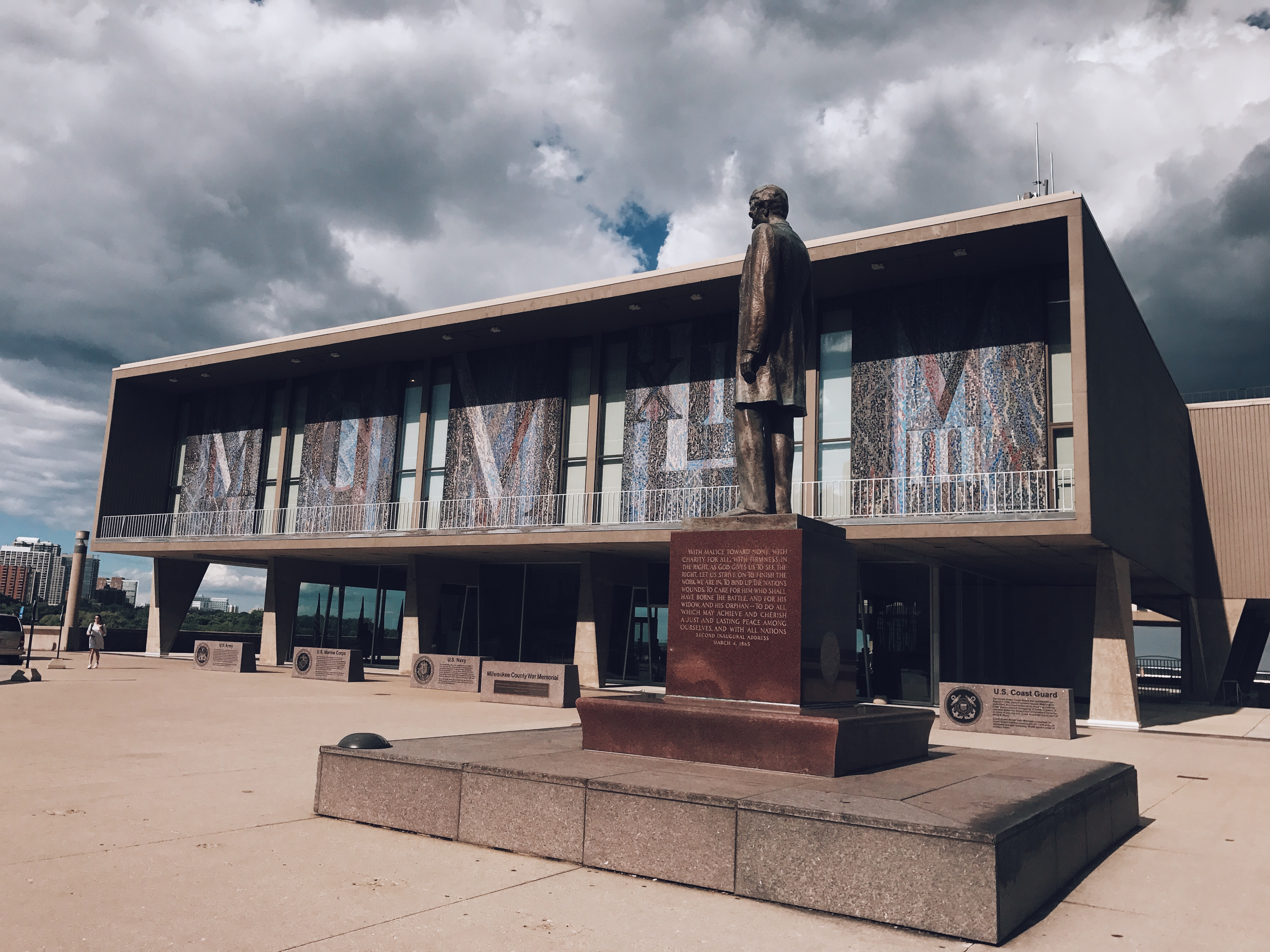
Edmund Lewandowski's mosaic on the west facade of the Milwaukee County War Memorial Center, seen in 2017

In the late 1940s, the Layton Art Gallery began to work with the Milwaukee Art Institute, another organization founded in 1888 that had gathered a significant collection. The two institutions organized a joint exhibition of contemporary Wisconsin art in 1948 to mark the state's centennial. The project of a new war memorial on the shores of Lake Michigan by architect Eliel Saarinen, succeeded by his son Eero, gave rise to calls for a centralized art center in Milwaukee, though Eero Saarinen himself originally found the idea of an art museum inside the memorial to be "peculiar". The move to the war memorial was supported by both Milwaukee Art Institute director La Vera Pohl and Layton School of Art director Edmund Lewandowski, Charlotte Partridge's successor, whom Saarinen selected to create a mosaic for the western facade of the building.

On July 18, 1955, the Layton Art Gallery and Milwaukee Art Institute signed an agreement with the Milwaukee County War Memorial Center to dedicate spaces in the new building for the display of their respective collections. Edward H. Dwight, curator of American art at the Cincinnati Art Museum, was appointed director of the new entity, named Milwaukee Art Center, in September of that year. Artworks in the Layton Art Gallery collection were relocated to the memorial and, in October 1957, the historic Audsley building on Jefferson Street was demolished. While the Gallery and the Institute officially merged, the Layton Collection reorganized as an independent collecting board within the new structure, renamed Milwaukee Art Museum in 1980.

== Works in the Layton Art Gallery ==
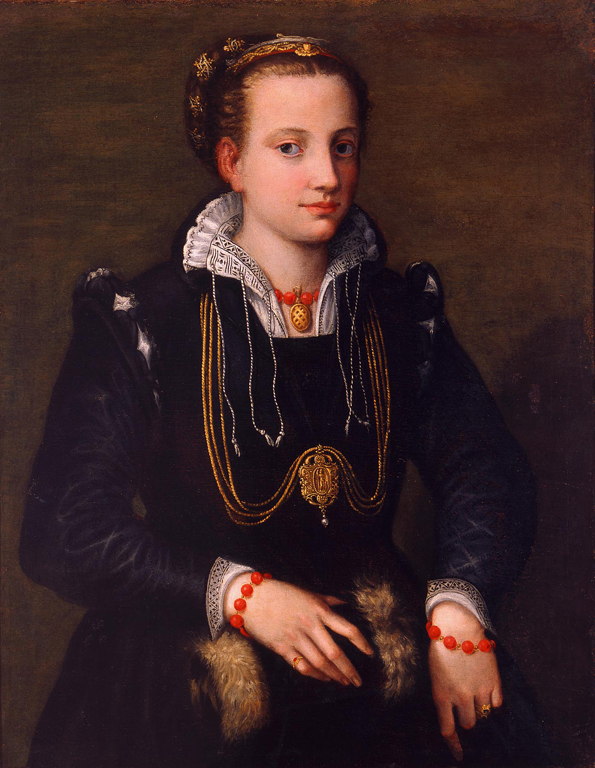
Sofonisba Anguissola, The Artist's Sister Minerva Anguissola, c. 1564

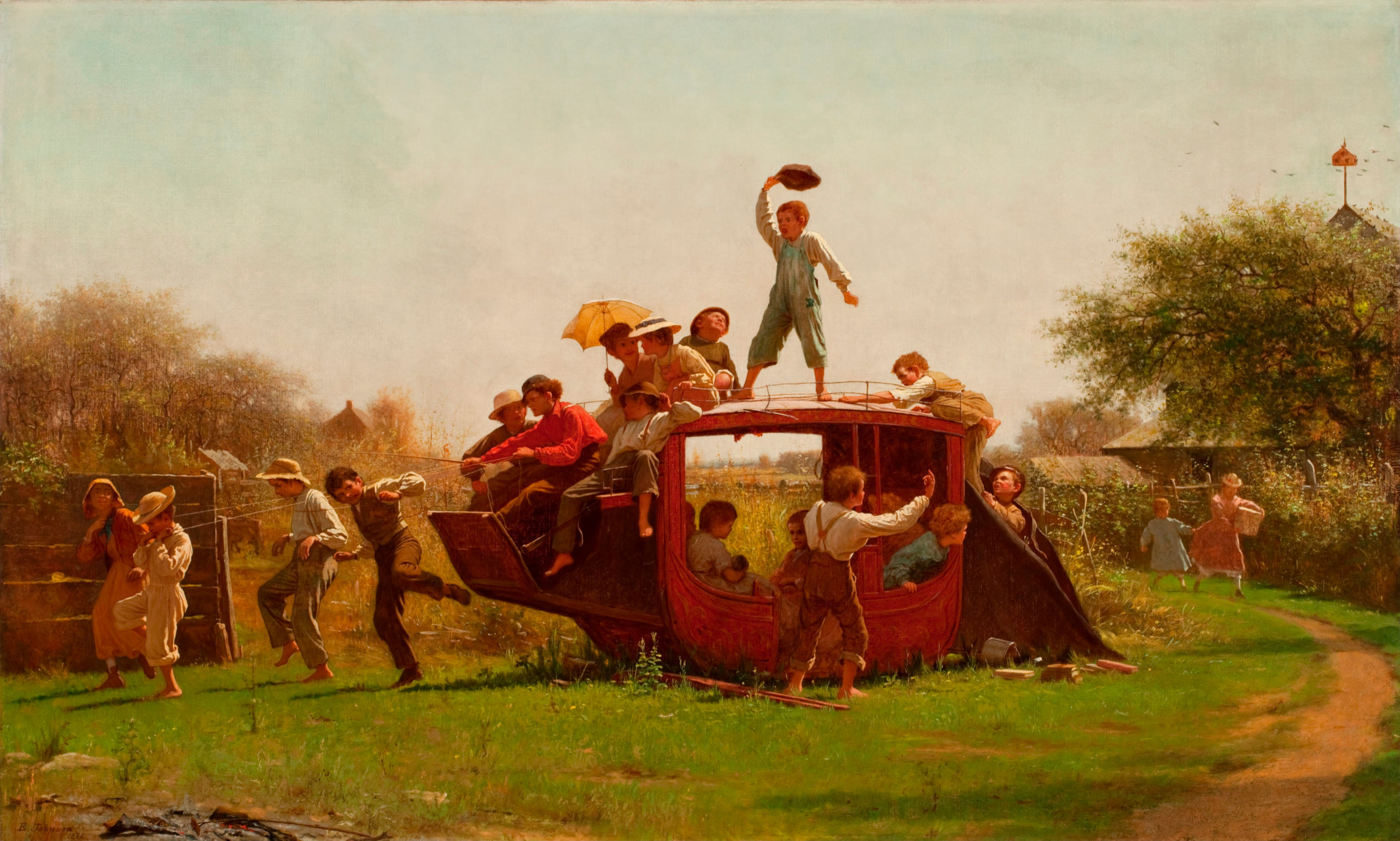
Eastman Johnson, The Old Stagecoach, 1871

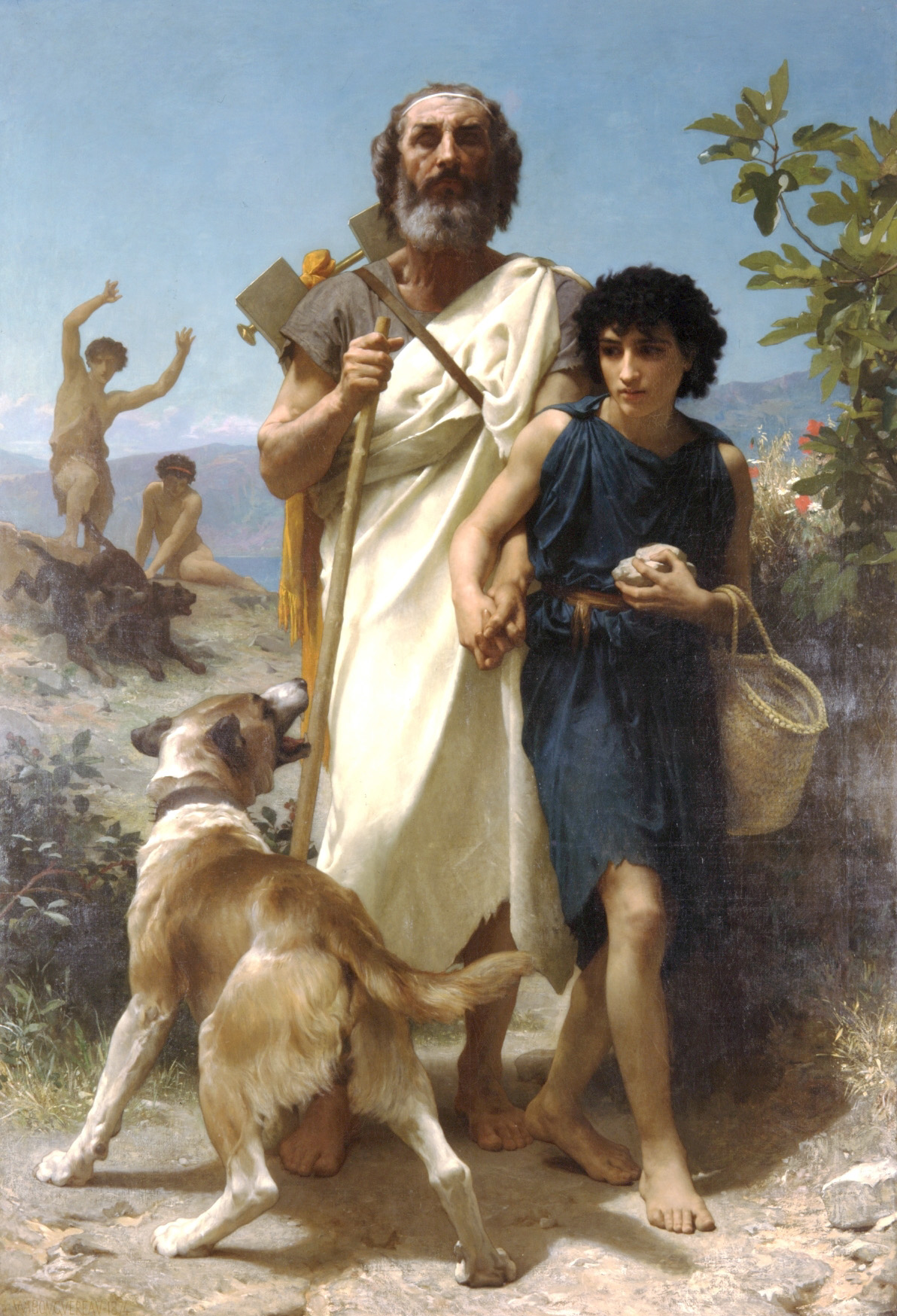
William-Adolphe Bouguereau, Homer and his Guide, 1874

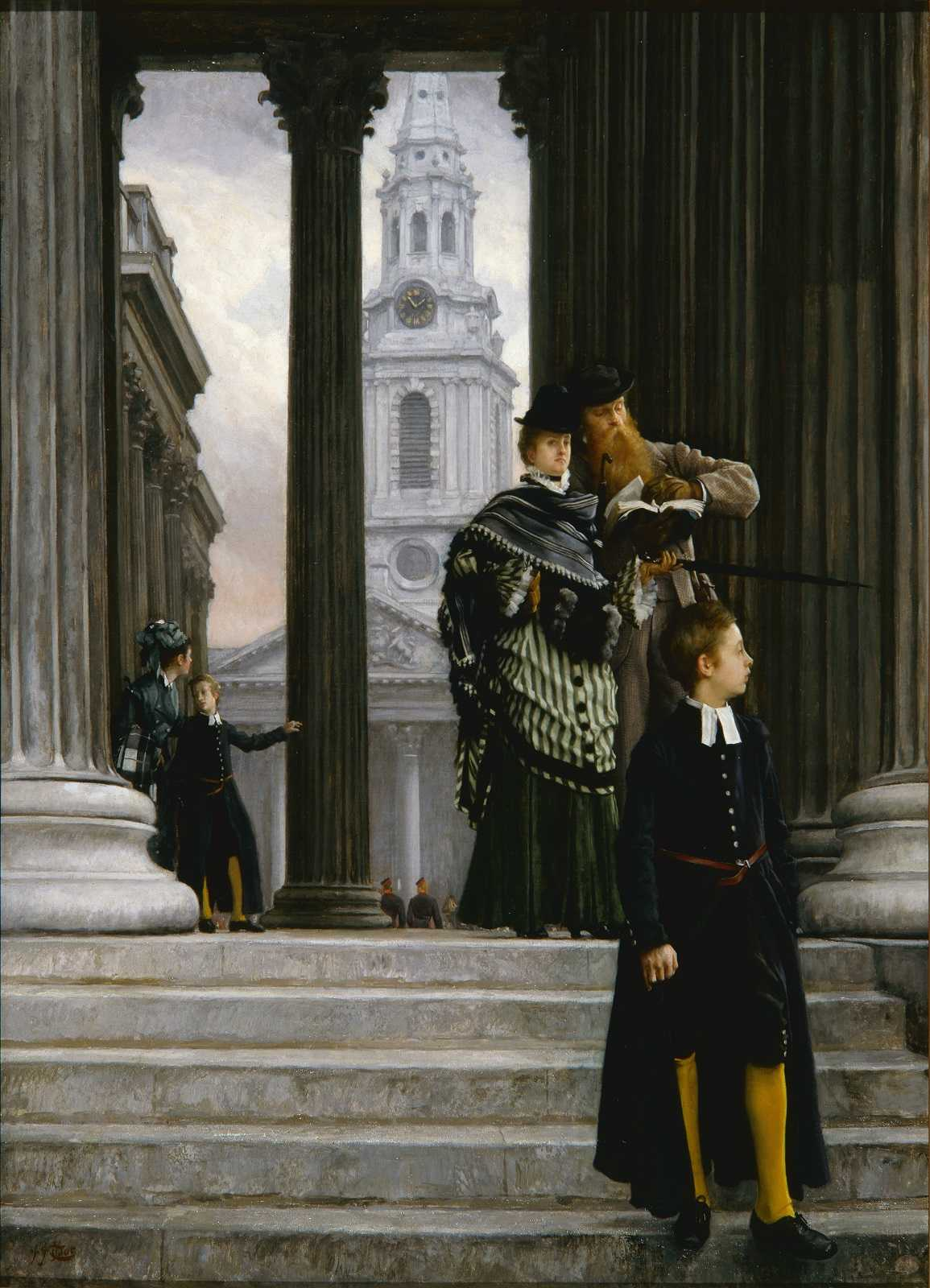
James Tissot, London Visitors, 1874

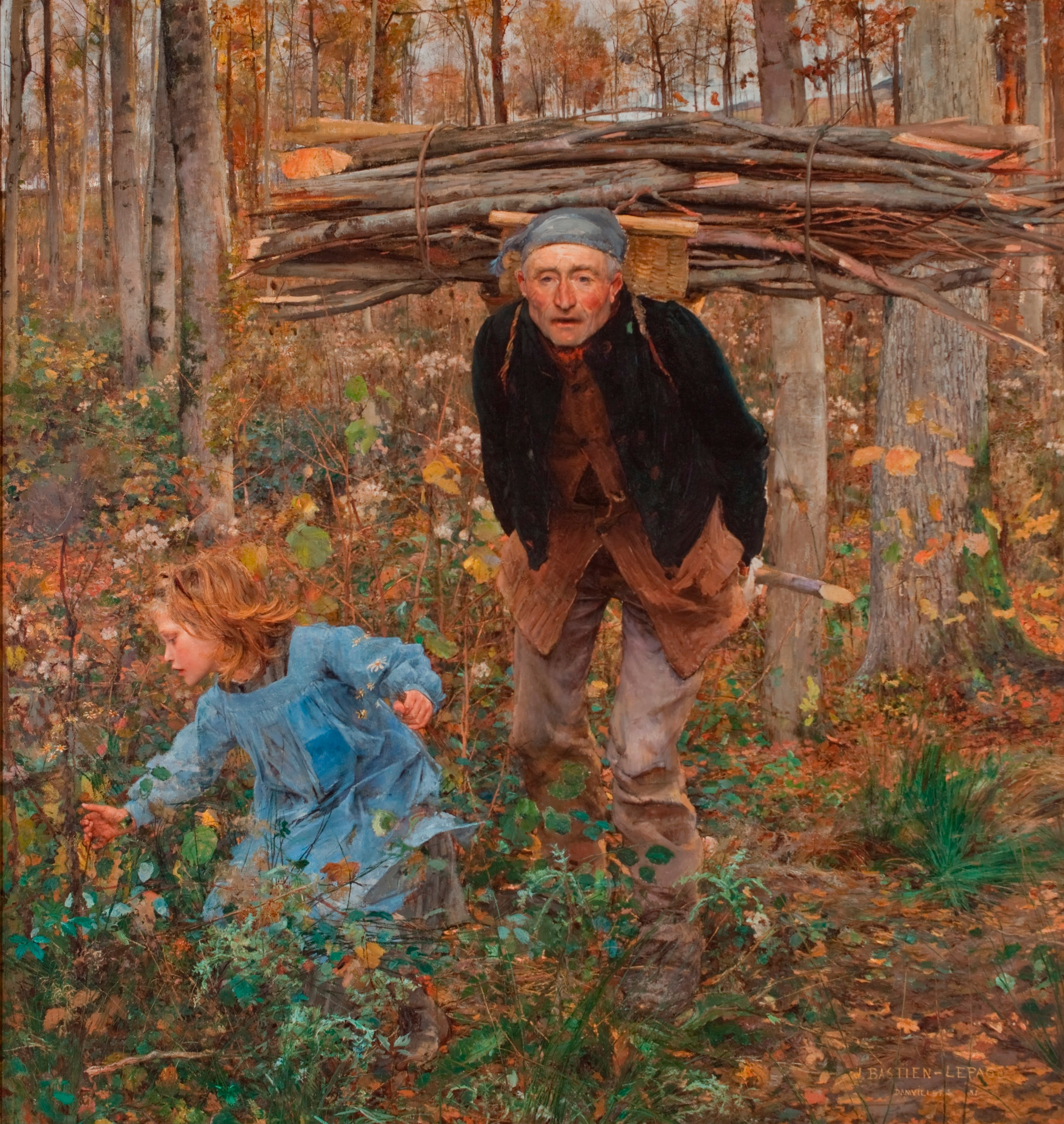
Jules Bastien-Lepage, Le Père Jacques, 1881

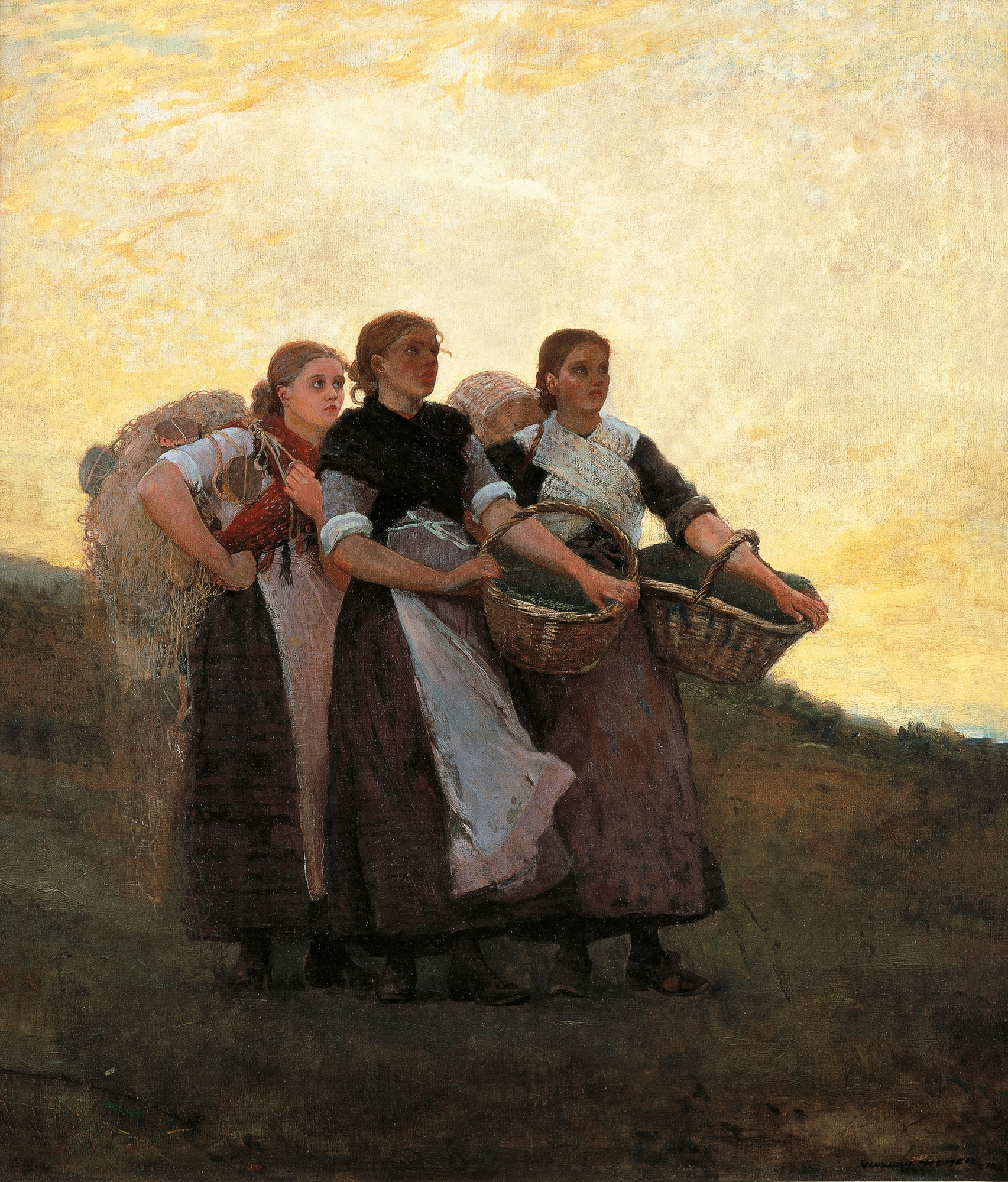
Winslow Homer, Hark! The Lark, 1882

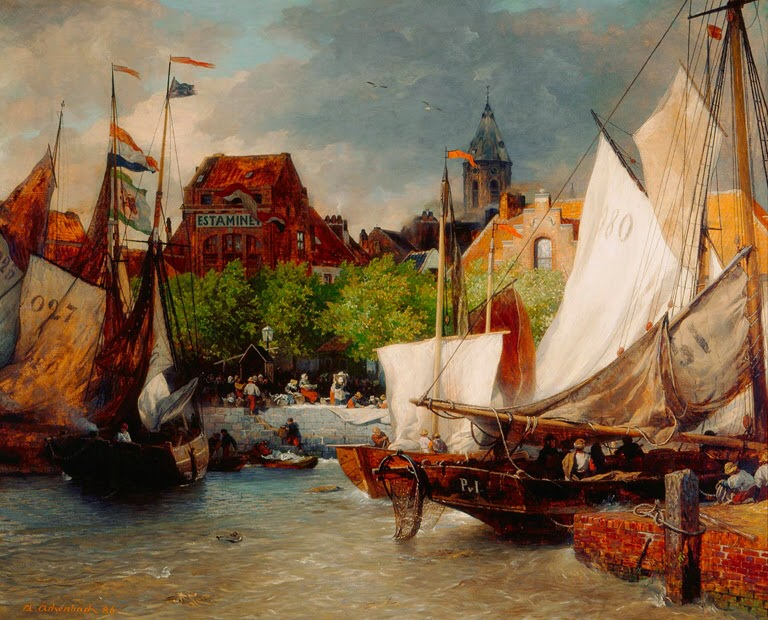
Andreas Achenbach, Fish Market at Ostend, 1886

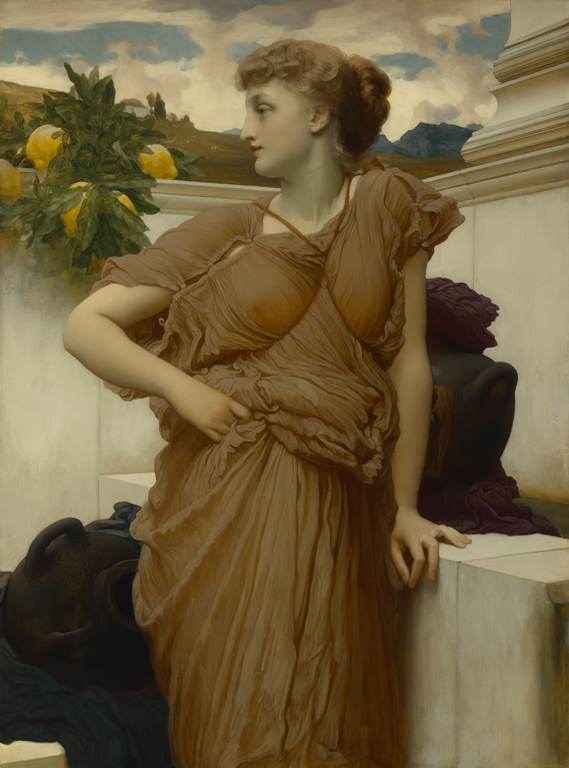
Frederic Leighton, At the Fountain, c. 1891–92

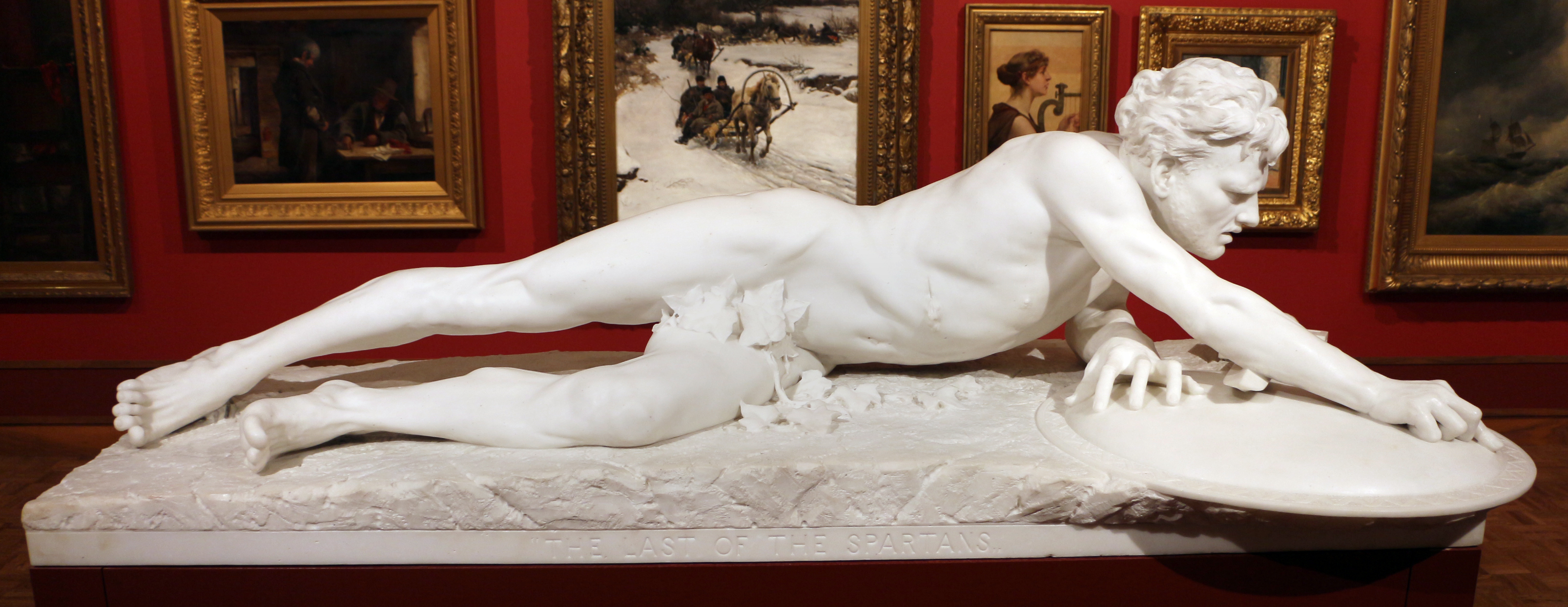
Gaetano Trentanove, The Last of the Spartans, 1892

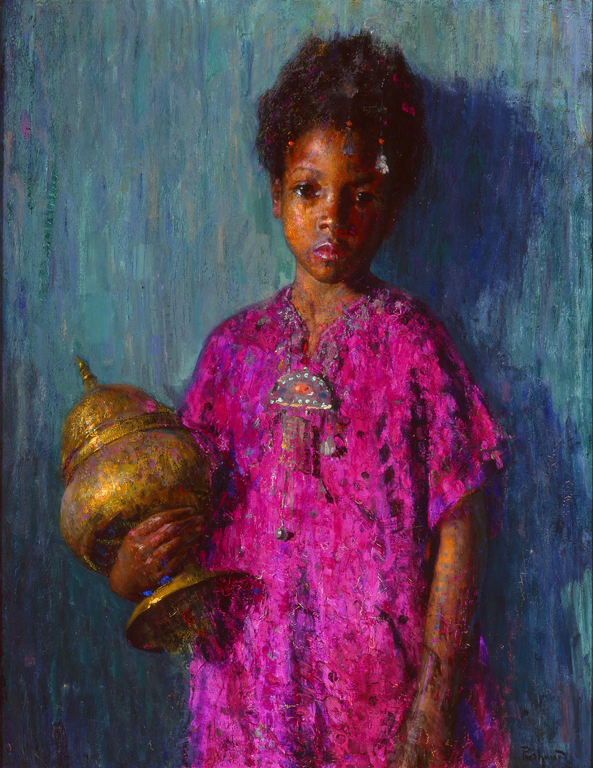
Hovsep Pushman, The Incense Burner, before 1921

== Layton School of Art ==
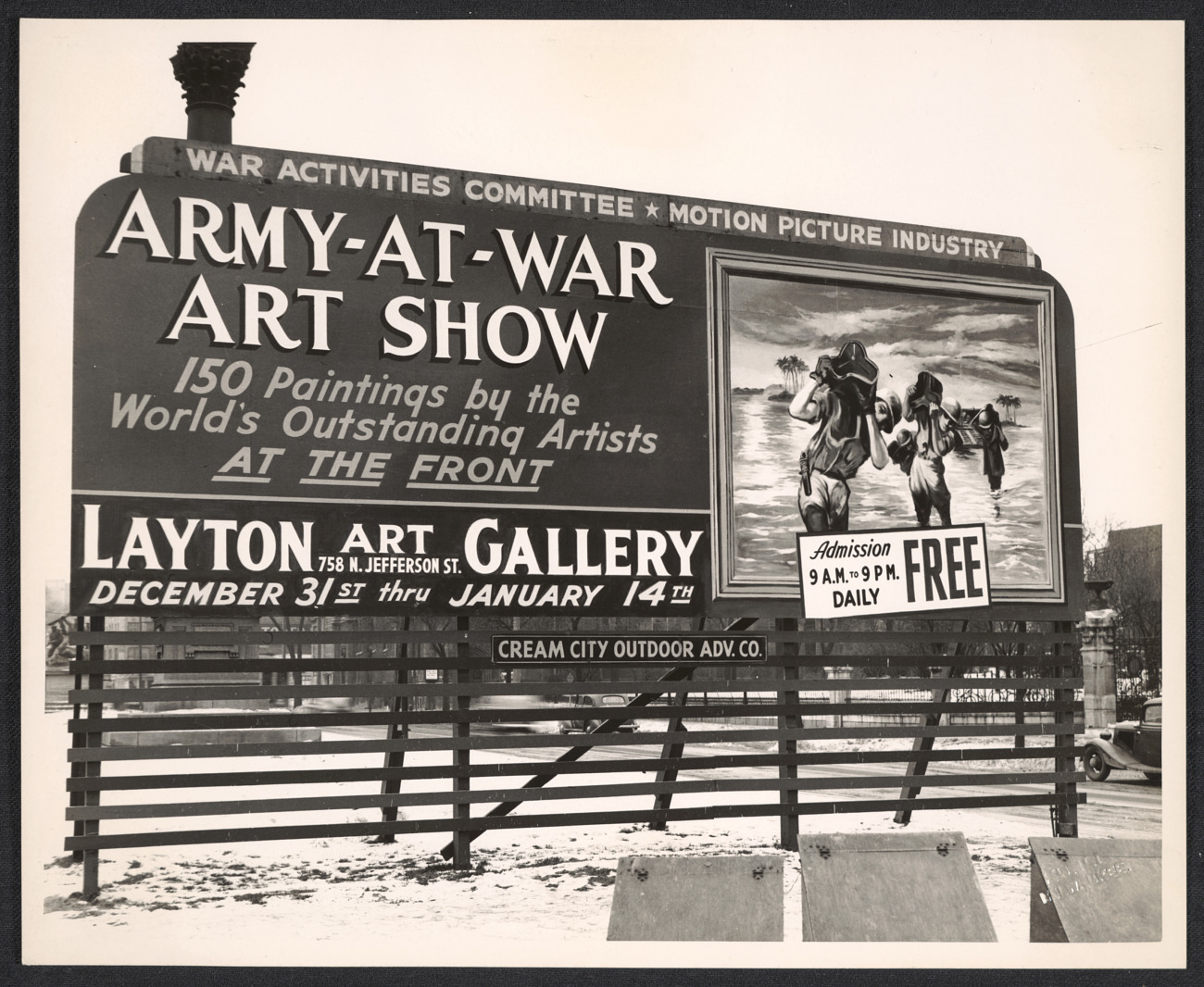
Milwaukee billboard for the Army-at-War exhibition organized by Layton School students, December 1944

Between 1920 and 1951, the Layton School of Art, managed by educators Charlotte Partridge and her partner Miriam Frink, operated within the gallery's building. Partridge and Frink had met at the Milwaukee-Downer College in 1915. In September 1920, Partridge, soon joined by Frink, opened the lower level of the Layton Art Gallery for classes, officially establishing the art school. Reflecting on the space, Partridge remarked that "the basement didn't have any hot water, didn't have but one wash room, had no electricity, a few gas light burners. It was a storage area, and they would give, I'd forgotten, each of the (Layton Art Gallery) trustees would give so many hundred dollars to remodel it. They said: "Go ahead and do as you please." And so we started."

The school's first full-time instructor was Wisconsin painter Gerrit V. Sinclair. As of 1925, it was able to offer a three-year diploma in fine arts, along with children's art classes. The school specialized in both the visual arts and design, and organized free art shows in support of the United States' WWII effort between 1941 and 1945. Regular and invited faculty between the 1920s and 1950s included artists Paul Faulkner, Emily Parker Groom, Knute Heldner, Walter Quirt, John David Brcin, Walter Sheffer, Ruth Grotenrath, George Niedecken, Santos Zingale, Dudley Crafts Watson, Richard Lippold, and Karl Priebe.

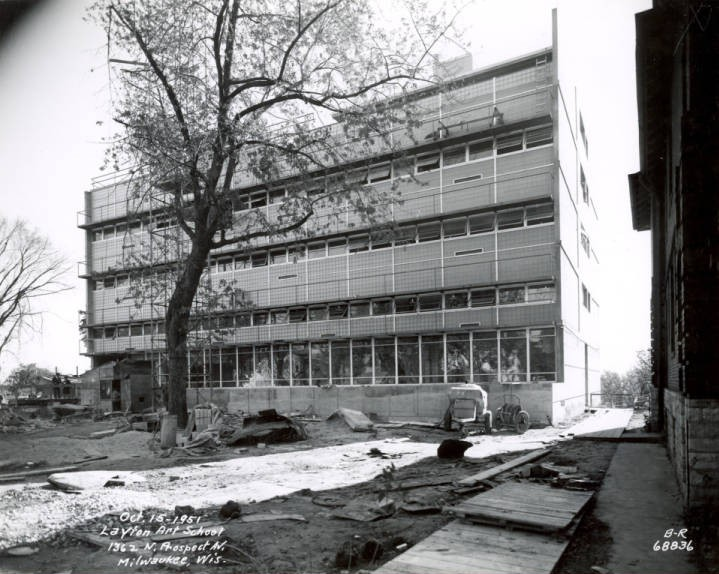
The new Layton Art School building under construction in October 1951

In 1951, the school moved into a new Bauhaus-inspired building on Prospect Avenue, in Milwaukee's East Side, overlooking Lake Michigan. The structure was designed by Edgar Bartolucci and John Waldheim, two alumni of the school, which counted over a thousand students at the time of the move. Three years later, both Partridge and Frink were forced to resign as directors and the institution was taken over by Edmund Lewandowski.

Facing years of financial difficulties, the Layton School of Art vacated its building, which was razed in 1970. Despite its relocation to a large structure in the vicinity of Estabrook Park, in the Milwaukee suburb of Glendale, the school closed down altogether in 1974. That same year, a group of ten former instructors, among whom artists Roland Poska and Guido Brink, founded the Milwaukee Institute of Art & Design. The institution settled in a renovated warehouse building that would later be named after philanthropist Jane Bradley Pettit, in the city's Historic Third Ward district.

Alumni of the Layton School of Art in its later years include painter John Arthur Yeates (1951), multidisciplinary artist JoAnna Poehlmann (1954), illustrator Lois Ehlert (1957), film director Larry Clark (1963), painter Tom Uttech (1965), and land artist Roy Staab (1965).

== See also ==
- List of museums in Wisconsin
- Milwaukee Art Museum

== Bibliography ==
- Mundy, James (1988). 1888: Frederick Layton and his World. Milwaukee, WI: Milwaukee Art Museum.
- Schulze, Franz (2001). Building a Masterpiece: Milwaukee Art Museum. Easthampton, MA: Hudson Hills Press.
- Eastberg, John C.; Vogel, Eric (2013). Layton's Legacy: A Historic American Art Collection, 1888–2013. Milwaukee, WI: Layton Art Collection, Inc.
