= John Yeates (disambiguation) =

John Yeates (born 1938), is an Australian professional football player. John Yeates may also refer to:

- John Arthur Yeates (1923–1972), American painter
- John Stuart Yeates (1900–1986), New Zealand botanist
