= Walter Sheffer =

Walter S. Sheffer
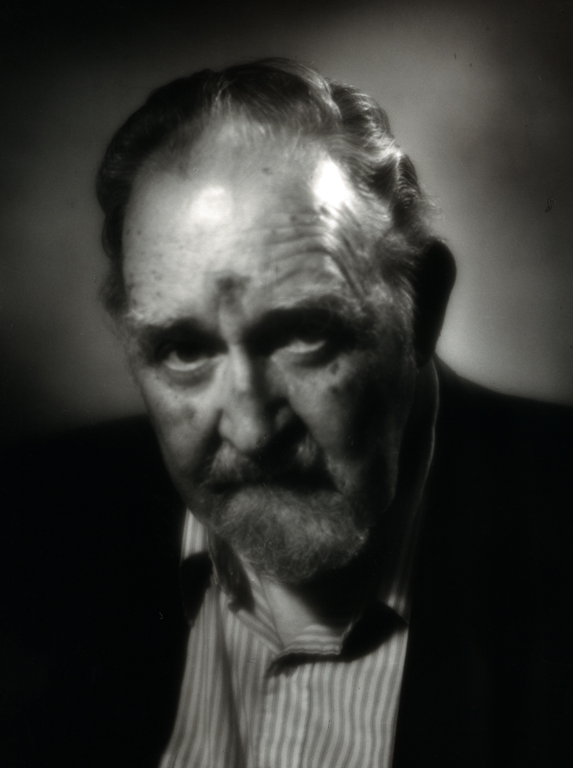
- Sheffer in 1993
- Born: August 7, 1918; Youngsville, Pennsylvania
- Died: July 14, 2002 (aged 83)
- Known for: Photography
- Awards: National Council on Aging, 1985

Walter S. Sheffer (August 7, 1918 – July 14, 2002) was an American photographer and teacher, born in Youngsville, Pennsylvania. He moved to Milwaukee, Wisconsin in 1945 to work at the studio of John Platz, Milwaukee's main society photographer. When Platz retired, Sheffer inherited his clientele and was able to establish his own "look" and a very successful portrait studio by 1953. He also taught advanced portraiture at the Layton School of Art from 1952 to 1970.

== Early career ==
After attending Houghton College, where he studied history with plans to be a lawyer, Sheffer returned to his hometown of Youngsville, Pennsylvania to teach high school history. He often lectured against war in his classroom as World War II escalated. Working for the college yearbook at Houghton College exposed him to photography and led him to leave teaching to work as a photographer for a department store in Pittsburgh. He later answered a newspaper ad for a photographer in Wisconsin because he admired the work of Wisconsin architect Frank Lloyd Wright and respected that Capital punishment in Wisconsin was abolished in 1853. He moved to Milwaukee in 1945 without "knowing a soul" to work for the prominent society portraitist John Platz. Inspired by the artistic achievements of Yousuf Karsh, Julia Margaret Cameron, Henri Cartier-Bresson, and Emily Dickinson, Sheffer approached portraiture in a poetic and artistic manner working to get close in order to isolate the subject. Using a handheld 35 mm camera, natural side lighting and dramatic darkroom techniques, the portraits he generated out of his own Jefferson Street studio were known as having the "Sheffer look". His portraits of Milwaukee's mid-century social elite, artists and architecture earned him the title "Photographer of Photographers" from the Wisconsin Professional Photographers Association in 1955. His clients included actor Jimmy Stewart, comedian Tallulah Bankhead, and politician Joseph McCarthy who he photographed for Life (magazine). He created the "Portraits of Men" series in the mid-1950s for DuPont, a manufacturer of photographic film and paper, which was destroyed in a fire at his studio. He was president of the Milwaukee Photo Pictorialists and the "Darlot Club" which he once described as the "self-appointed ten best photographers in Wisconsin." The groups favored pictorial style soft focus lenses, and deep shadows in prints. He photographed theater productions extensively for Marquette University from 1955 to 1968 where many of his works are preserved in a photographic archive. Several of his portraits are also held in the collection of the Milwaukee Art Museum.

Sheffer photographed Victorian building facades and architectural fragments for the Heritage Milwaukee: The Esthetics of the City exhibition organized by and exhibited at the Milwaukee Art Center April 2-May 10, 1964. Director Tracy Atkinson wrote of Sheffer, "A city is fortunate to have a chronicler with so perceptive an eye. A long-time Milwaukee resident, Sheffer is among that small group of people in love with the face of the city, and he is, in addition, an artist acutely sensitive to its many moods and its slightest changes of expression."

Among his most notable students at the Layton School of Art, where he taught from 1952 to 1970, was photographer/film maker Larry Clark who often named Sheffer as an early artistic influence and once described him as "the society photographer in town, but he was very hip."

== Late career ==
After years of decreased activity due to personal strife in the 1970s and early 1980s, Sheffer gained national attention in the mid-1980s for his "Faces of Aging" photographic series. Thirty-five dramatic black-and-white portraits of his fellow residents at the River Hills East Health Care Center on Milwaukee's east side became an inspiring, travelling exhibition. The display travelled from Milwaukee to Newport Beach, San Diego, Chicago, Washington DC and Seattle. Together with Milwaukee artist Sue Bartfield, who worked with him on the project, he was honored in 1985 by the National Council on Aging in Washington D.C. for this work.

Sheffer remained engaged with art, music, poetry and ideas throughout his life. He often attended gallery and museum openings and presented lectures on his life's work at Milwaukee Institute of Art and Design where he once told students: "Photography will change your life. After you photograph, you notice the light and it exposes you to beauty." His circle of friends gathered daily at the Brady Street Pharmacy in Milwaukee to discuss art and recent events. Former Milwaukee Art Museum photography curator Tom Bamberger described Sheffer as "the center of intellectual life" in Milwaukee. Sheffer continued to photograph friends and maintained a flower garden on the roof top of Christopher Street East Health Care Center until his death.

== Sources ==
- James Auer and Fanny White. "Photographer Sheffer helped others to open eyes", Milwaukee Journal Sentinel, Milwaukee, Wisconsin, July 15, 2002.
- Joy Gross Berman and Tracy Atkinson. "Heritage-Milwaukee", Arrow Press, Milwaukee, March 1964.
