= Tom Uttech =

American landscape painter & photographer

- Born: October 27, 1942 (age 83); Merrill, Wisconsin
- Education: Layton School of Art; University of Cincinnati
- Alma mater: University of Wisconsin–Milwaukee

Tom Uttech (born October 27, 1942) is an American landscape painter, photographer, and former art professor. His inspiration has come from his Wisconsin origins, as well as his travels to northern Minnesota and the Quetico Provincial Park in Ontario.

== Biography ==
Born in Merrill, Wisconsin, Uttech received a BA from Layton School of Art in Milwaukee in 1965 and an MFA from the University of Cincinnati in 1976. Uttech's primary painting teacher was Guido Brink. After completing his studies, Uttech was a professor of art at the University of Wisconsin-Milwaukee until 1998. He resides in Saukville, Wisconsin.

== Art ==
Neiab Nin Nasikodadimin, Bejigwan (1996), Honolulu Museum of Art.

Uttech is known for his moody depictions of North American woodlands and animals that inhabit them. Uttech's painting Neiab Nin Nasikodadimin, Bejigwan (Chippewa for "we reunite") in the collection of the Honolulu Museum of Art is typical of the artist's moody, but slightly stylized, landscapes. Museums in Georgia, Arkansas, Hawaii, Wisconsin, Wyoming, Louisiana, Oklahoma, Pennsylvania, and Arizona hold works by Uttech. His gallery exhibition at Alexandre Gallery in New York in 2023 showcased his latest paintings and raised awareness about the decline in wilderness. Alexandre also exhibited Uttech's new paintings from November 1 to December 20, 2025.
