= Statue of Jacques Marquette =

Statue by Gaetano Trentanove

Jacques Marquette
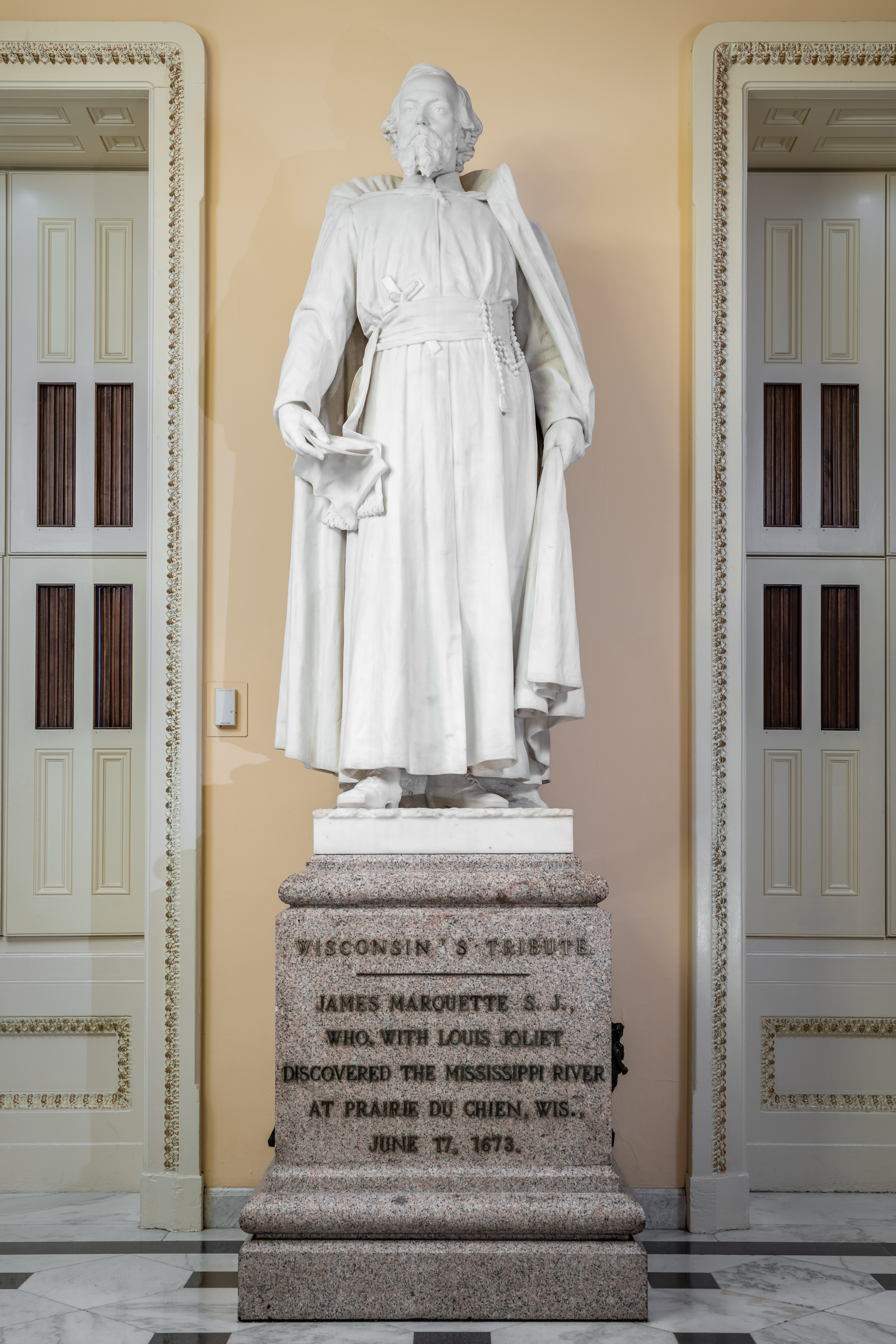
- The statue in the United States Capitol
- Artist: Gaetano Trentanove

Jacques Marquette is a statue by Gaetano Trentanove of Jacques Marquette, the best-known version being the 1896 marble one installed in the National Statuary Hall Collection in the Capitol in Washington D.C.

== Versions ==
=== National Statuary Hall Collection ===
The statue in the National Statuary Hall Collection is one of two donated by the state of Wisconsin. The work was accepted into the senate in 1896.

=== Marquette, Michigan ===
Another version of the statue is the 1897 bronze casting located in Pere Marquette Park, Marquette, Michigan which was cast in Florence, Italy, and includes two bas reliefs set in the sandstone base.

=== Mackinac Island, Michigan ===
In 1909, a third version was dedicated in Marquette Park on Mackinac Island, Michigan. A plaster version of the statue is located at the State Historical Society of Wisconsin.

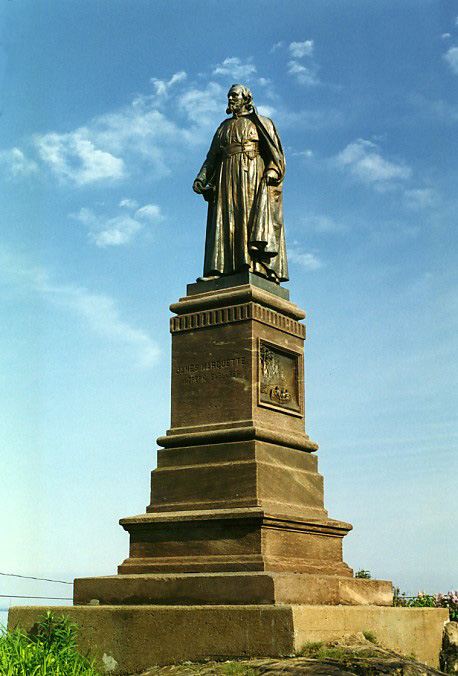
The statue in Pere Marquette Park, Marquette, Michigan

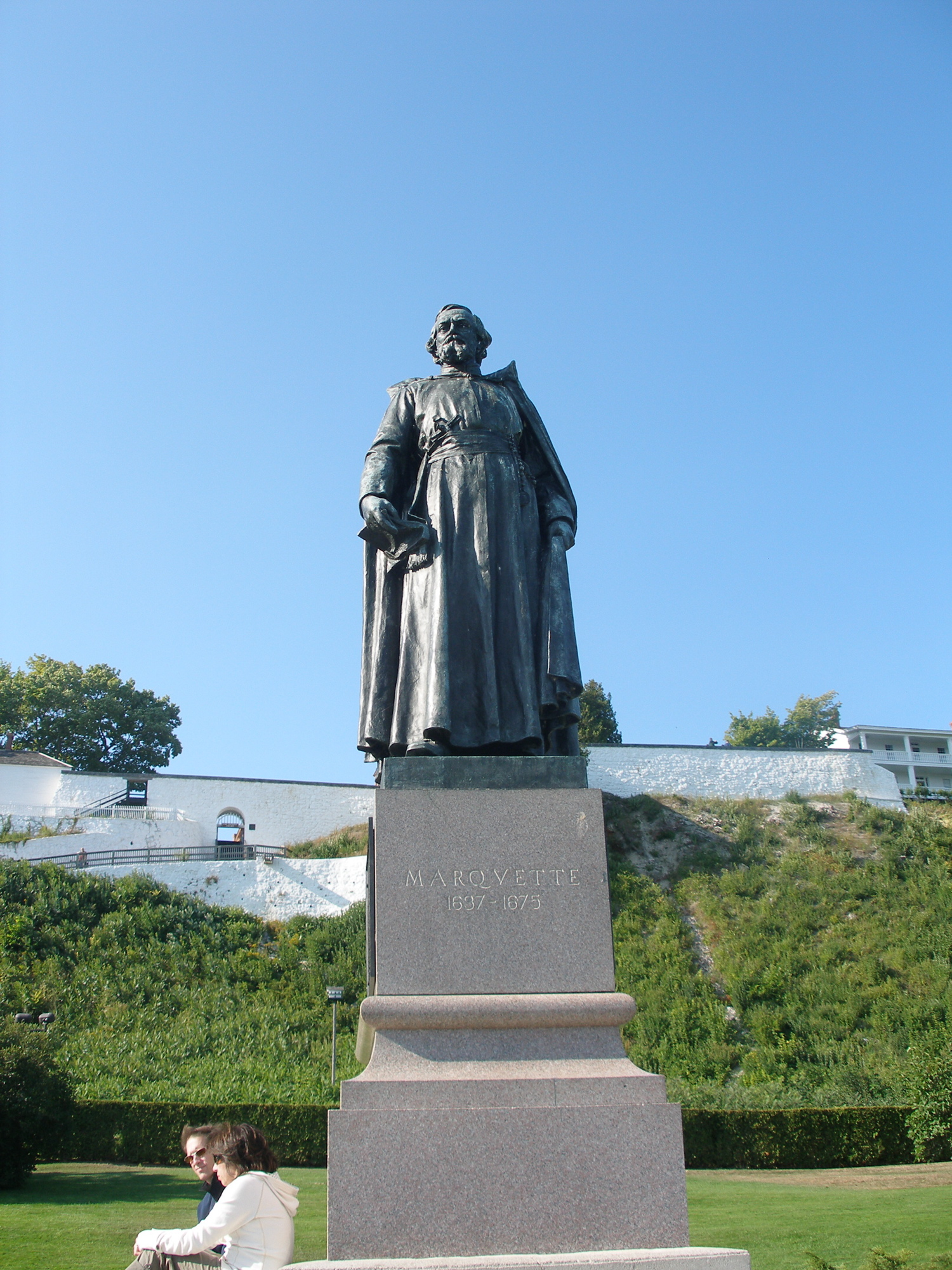
Mackinac Island
