= Gaetano Trentanove =

American sculptor

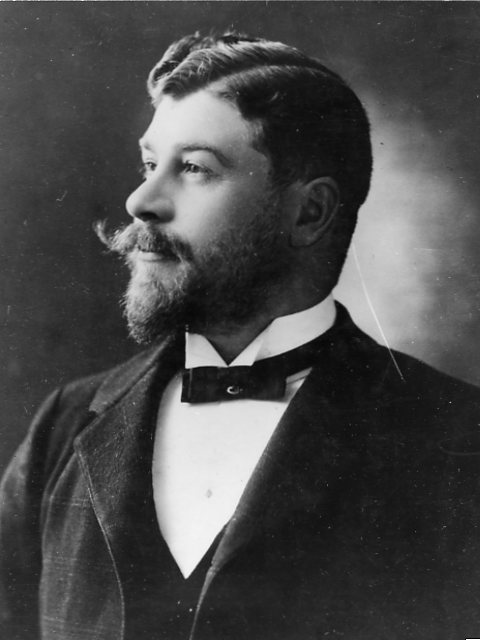
- Born: February 21, 1858
- Died: March 13, 1937 (aged 79)

Gaetano Trentanove (February 21, 1858 – March 13, 1937) was an Italian and American sculptor.

== Biography ==
Trentanove was born in Florence, Grand Duchy of Tuscany, a goldsmith's son. He studied at the Florentine Academy; he was later named honorary scholar of this academy and Parma. Trentanove had an active early career in Italy. He completed Gaddo movente (his first work), awarded a gold medal by the Società Promotrice delle Belle Arti. He completed both a full size statue for his palace and a funereal monument for Count Alfredo Serristori for the cemetery of Figline. He sculpted the sculptural group Tito Vezio e Licena. he sculpted the monument of Signora Fraschetti, placing a crown of flowers on the tomb of her husband in San Miniato. He completed many portrait busts including one of Federigo Campanella. He designed a statue raised on the loggie of the Mercato Nuovo of Florence.

Trentanove opened a studio in Milwaukee, Wisconsin, as a result of friendships made in Paris. His initial contact with Milwaukee was made as a student when William E. Cramer, the editor of the Evening Wisconsin, visited Giovanni Dupre's studio, where Trentanove was studying. For the World's Columbian Exposition of 1893, Trentanove sculpted the Otriade or Last of the Spartans, a large white Carrara marble statue. When the Chicago fair closed, Cramer purchased the Spartan statue for the Layton Art Gallery in Milwaukee. Trentanove thus became a regular visitor to Milwaukee and taught classes at the Layton Art Gallery.

Trentanove subsequently acquired American citizenship and although he spent a portion of every year in Florence, where the foundry that cast his models in bronze was located, he passed most of the remainder of his life in Milwaukee. In 1897 Trentanove was created a knight of the Order of the Crown of Italy. After retirement, he returned to Italy where he died.

Trentanove's public monuments are more easily located than his portrait sculptures, figural sculptures and decorative sculpture.

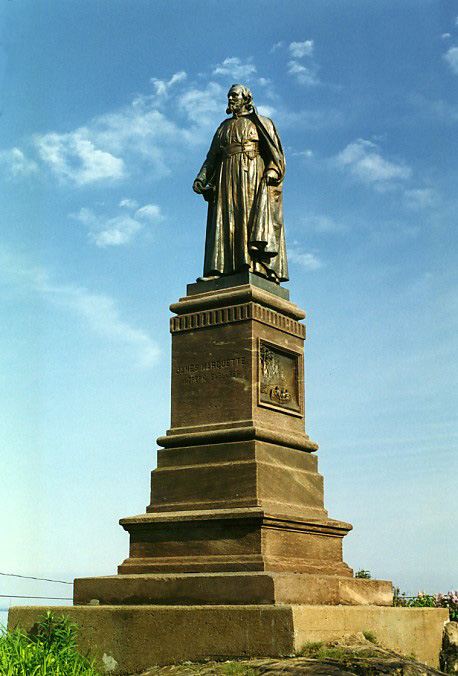
Pere Marquette statue in Marquette, Michigan

== Selected works ==
- 1889 Victor Hugo, shown at the Exposition Universelle (1889), Paris. Now at Gallery of Modern Art, Florence.
- 1892 The Last of the Spartans, Milwaukee Art Museum. Purchased at the Esposizione di Belle Arti, Parma, by William Cramer and donated in 1893 to the Layton Art Gallery, Milwaukee.

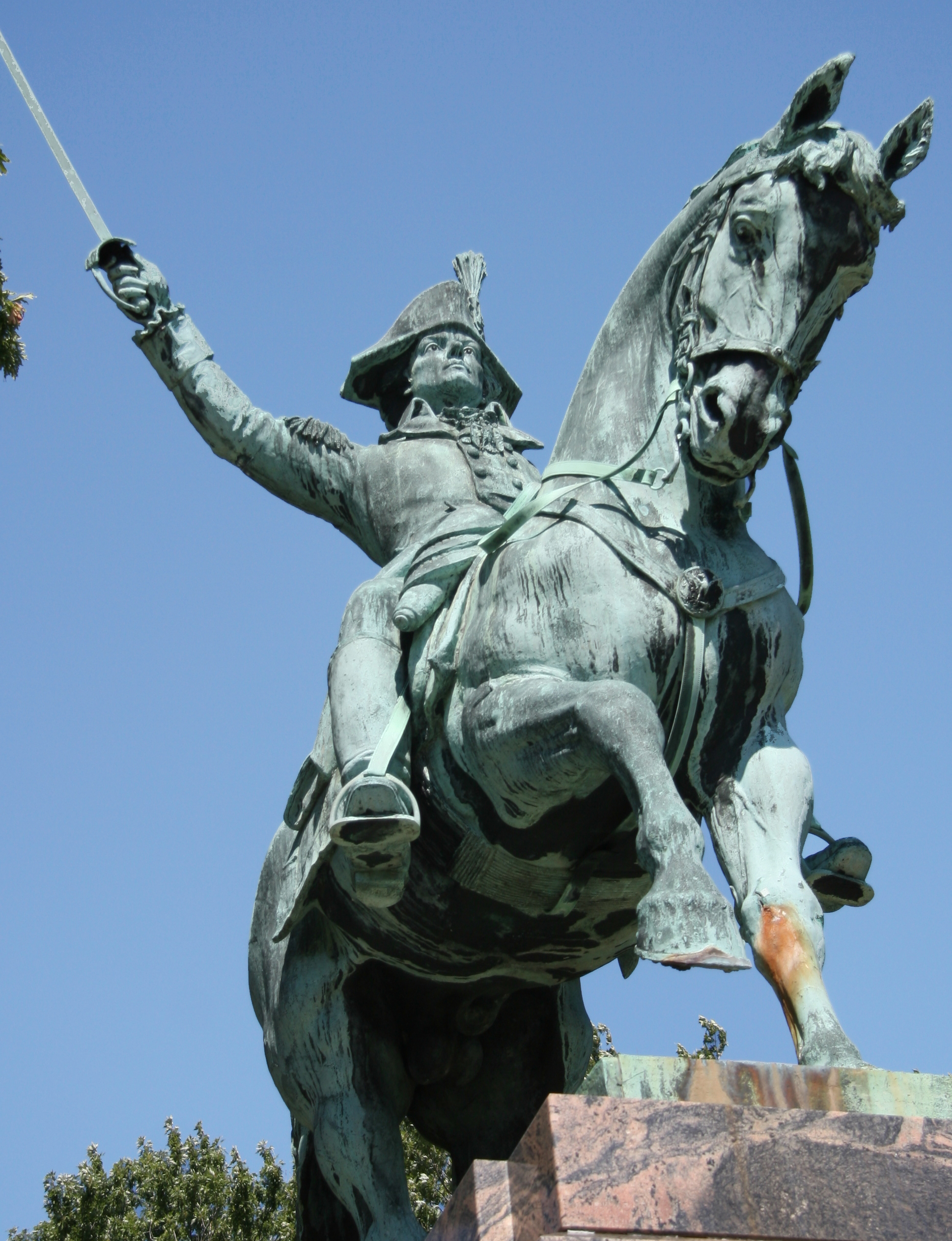
Kościuszko monument in Kosciuszko Park on the South Side of Milwaukee

- 1896 Father Jacques Marquette, National Statuary Hall, U.S. Capitol, Washington, D.C.
- 1897 Father Jacques Marquette, public statue at Marquette, Michigan
- 1898 Bust of Peter White Peter White Public Library, Marquette, Michigan
- 1900 Daniel Webster for the Daniel Webster Memorial, Scott Circle, Washington, D.C.
- 1901 Brigadier General Albert Pike, Judiciary Square, Washington, D.C.. Pulled from its plinth by protestors and set alight on June 19, 2020
- 1904 Tadeusz Kościuszko, Cleveland Museum of Art
- 1904 Andrew Carnegie bust for Carnegie Library in Atlanta, Georgia. Now in lobby of the Atlanta-Fulton Public Library System's Central Library.
- 1905 General Thaddeus Kosciuszko, Kosciuszko Park, Milwaukee, Wisconsin
- 1907 Father Jacques Marquette, public statue at Marquette Park (Mackinac Island)
- Giovanni Villani for a niche of the Loggia del Mercato Nuovo, Florence.
- Soldiers' Monument, Oshkosh, Wisconsin
- Governor Nelson Dewey, Lancaster, Wisconsin
- President McKinley, Somerville, New Jersey
- Oshkosh, commemorating the treaty with the Menominee
