= George Raab (Wisconsin painter) =

American painter from Wisconsin

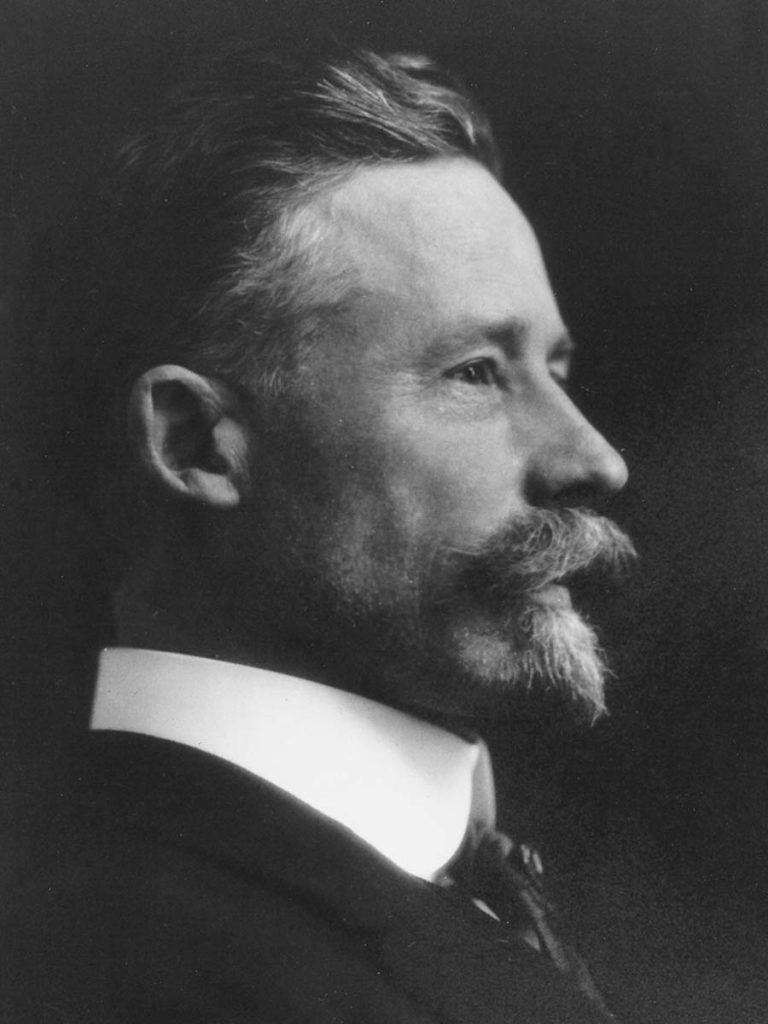
- George Raab (undated, ca. 1910s-20s)
- Born: February 26, 1866^{α} Sheboygan, Wisconsin
- Died: September 24, 1943 (aged 77); Milwaukee, Wisconsin
- Resting place: Wildwood Cemetery, Sheboygan, Wisconsin

George Raab (February 26, 1866 – September 24, 1943) was an American painter, printmaker, arts educator, and museum curator active in Wisconsin and Illinois.

Associated with the development of art institutions in Milwaukee in the early twentieth centuries, Raab was a founding member of the Society of Milwaukee Artists (now Wisconsin Visual Artists), served as curator of the Layton Art Gallery, and taught at several Midwestern institutions. His work incorporated elements of Impressionism and Regionalism.

== Early life and education ==
Raab was born in Sheboygan, Wisconsin, to German immigrant parents Christian Raab (1822–1880) and Charlotte Bode (1822–1899). Around 1890, he began studying in Milwaukee under painters Richard Lorenz and Robert Schade. He continued his education in Europe, studying at the Grand Ducal Saxon Art School in Weimar under Carl Frithjof Smith and Académie Colarossi in Paris with Gustave Courtois. His European time exposed him to academic painting, Munich School realism, and French Impressionism.

== Career ==
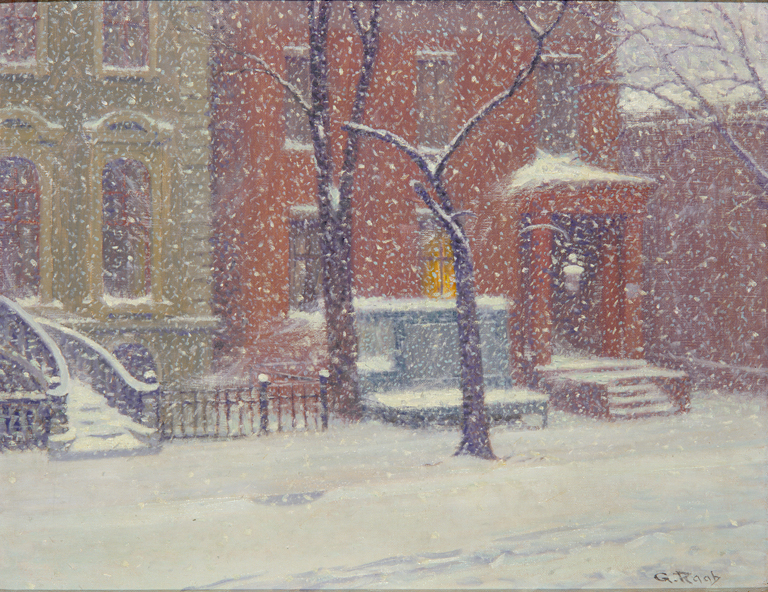
A Veil of Snow, ca. 1910

Returning to Milwaukee in the late 1890s, Raab became involved in the city's artistic community. In 1900, he exhibited alongside Alexander Mueller and Louis Mayer, and the three artists helped establish the Society of Milwaukee Artists, soon renamed Wisconsin Painters and Sculptors. Raab served as the organization's president in 1916–17.

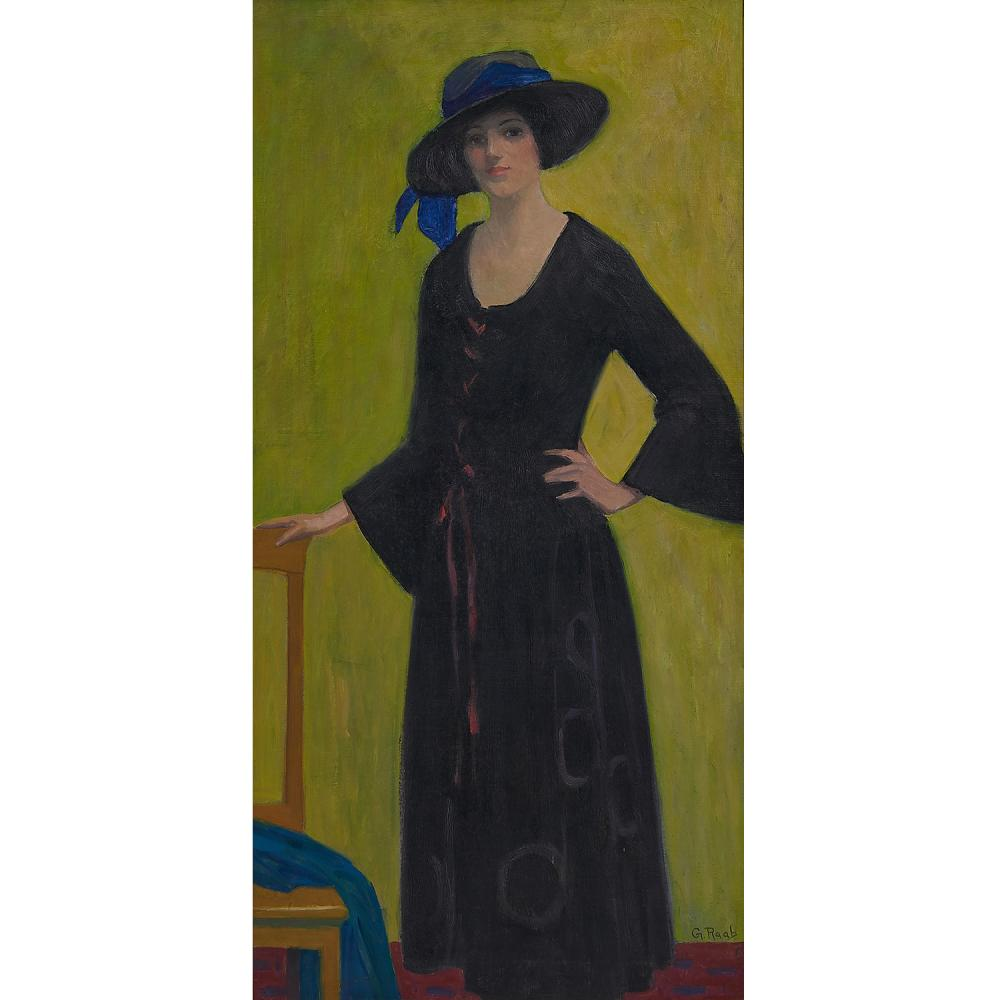
Woman in a Black Dress, ca. 1925

From 1901 until 1909, Raab taught at the Milwaukee Art Students League. Beginning in 1902, he also served as curator of the Layton Art Gallery, one of Wisconsin's first art institutions. He remained in that role until 1922, when the gallery's board of trustees, disappointed at the lack of changes to the original displays, forced his resignation. Meanwhile, he sat on the Milwaukee Art Commission, helping oversee public art acquisitions and aesthetic standards for public buildings.

In 1917, Raab received a Milwaukee Art Institute's award for a portrait of his mother. During the early 1920s he taught at the Wisconsin State Normal School before relocating to Illinois. There, he became educational director of the Springfield Art Institute, then directed the Decatur Art Institute, housed in the historic James Millikin House and managed jointly with Millikin University. He retired in 1937 and returned to Milwaukee, where he maintained a studio until his death on September 24, 1943.

== Artistic style ==
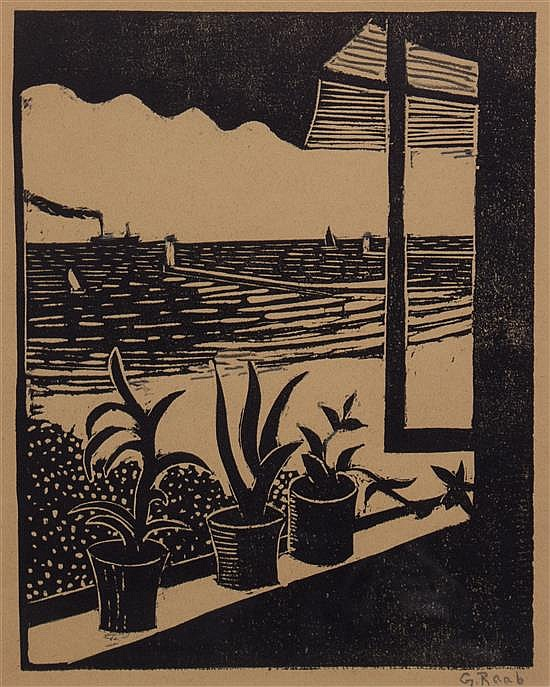
Potted Plants, a woodblock print by Raab

Raab primarily painted landscapes and portraits, although he also produced relief sculptures. His early paintings reflect the influence of the Barbizon School, while many later works incorporate Impressionist handling of light and atmosphere. During the 1930s, he turned to watercolor and color woodblock printing. His landscapes depict scenes throughout Wisconsin and Illinois, while his portrait commissions included civic leaders, educators, and prominent Milwaukee residents.

== Collections ==
Works by Raab are held in several public collections, including:

- Milwaukee Art Museum
- Museum of Wisconsin Art
- John Michael Kohler Arts Center
- Milwaukee County Historical Society
- Milwaukee Public Library
- Mead Public Library
- Illinois State Museum

== Notes ==
^α Though his tombstone at Wildwood Cemetery, Sheboygan, states his birth date as February 26, 1864, the majority of sources use the birth year of 1866, which is confirmed by Wisconsin birth indexes and the 1870 United States census for Sheboygan County, where his age is listed as four.
