= Walter Quirt =

American painter

Walter Quirt (born November 24, 1902 - March 19, 1968) was an American artist. He was employed by WPA Federal Arts Project for seven years. He painted many small panels that showed his influences from Diego Rivera, and Jose Orozco. Quirt was awarded the Cranbrook prize at the Michigan Artists Annual exhibition in 1946 that was held in Detroit, Michigan. He was also awarded the Wisconsin Centennial Prize at the Wisconsin Artists Annual in 1948.

== Early life and education ==
Born in Iron River, Michigan, Quirt attended the Layton School of Art in Milwaukee, Wisconsin in 1921. He also studied at the MacDowell Colony in New Hampshire. Quirt began to teach art classes to some novice students up through 1926. During his time at the schools he painted some of his early watercolor paintings which were exhibited at the Art Institute of Chicago in 1926, as well as in the International Watercolor Exhibitions of 1929.

== Art career ==
Quirt's works are in the collections of the de Young Museum, San Francisco; the Henry Art Gallery, University of Washington, Seattle; the Minneapolis Institute of Art; the Museum of Modern Art, New York; the San Francisco Museum of Modern Art, the Smithsonian Museum of American Art, Washington, D.C.; the Wadsworth Atheneum Museum of Art, Hartford, CT; the Walker Art Center, Minneapolis; the Weisman Art Museum, University of Minnesota, Minneapolis; and the Whitney Museum of American Art, New York, among others.

"The great artist is one who faithfully follows his impulses, who vigorously and courageously peels off layer after layer of restrictions, prohibitions, and inhibitions. This takes courage, for it automatically means suffering." - Walter Quirt
