= Roland Poska =

American painter

- Born: 1938; Scotland
- Died: February 2, 2017 (aged 78–79); Rockford, Illinois, US
- Education: Rockford College; Cranbrook Academy of Art
- Known for: Printmaking; papermaking; painting
- Notable work: "The Great Human Race"; "From Blue to Blue"
- Website: rolandposka.com

Roland Poska (1938 – February 2, 2017) was an American artist who was notable for pioneering papermaking in modern art, for printmaking, and for frequently combining the two into completed works of art. He was also a teacher at the Layton School of Art in Milwaukee, Wisconsin, a co-founder of the Milwaukee Institute of Art & Design, and founder of the lithography studio the Fishy Whale Press.

== Biography ==
Poska was born to Lithuanian parents in Scotland in 1938. At age 10, he and his parents immigrated to the United States, and settled in Rockford, Illinois. After receiving degrees from Rockford College and Cranbrook Academy of Art, he became an instructor at Rockford College, then in 1963, moved to Milwaukee, where he taught at the Layton School of Art. When Layton closed, he co-founded the Milwaukee School of Art and Design and taught there.

In 1963, while attending Cranbrook, Poska was introduced to papermaking by Laurence Barker, the dean of the school's graphics department. In 1967, he purchased his first "beater", a machine that grinds rags and pulp in the initial step of producing handmade paper, and established his lithography studio the Fishy Whale Press. At the time, his lithography press was among the largest in the United States, using 600 pounds (270 kg) blocks of stone. Under the Fishy Whale imprint, Poska and artist John Doyle produced The Great Human Race, a series of prints designed by Doyle that appear in the collections of a number of American museums. Poska continued to develop The Great Human Race as a perpetual art and philosophy project for over 30 years. He would go on to be recognized as a pioneer in the artistic medium of papermaking.

By 1984, Poska was a nationally known artist. That year, he received a commission to produce a 270-foot (82 m) long painting From Blue to Blue, which was displayed on Main Street in Rockford before its installation in Milwaukee's Henry S. Reuss Federal Plaza Building. This piece was produced in sections 6 to 8 feet (1.8 to 2.4 m) high and 12 to 16 feet (3.7 to 4.9 m) long, and then assembled to complete the full installation.

His works are included in the collections of the Art Institute of Chicago and The Metropolitan Museum of Art.

In his later years, Poska became an outspoken activist for equality and common human rights, and was a frequent speaker at Rockford town hall meetings. He died on February 2, 2017, in Rockford.
