= Roy Staab =

American artist (born 1941)

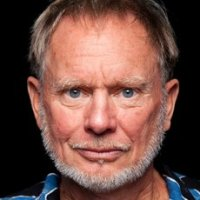
- Staab in 2012
- Born: September 9, 1941 (age 84); Milwaukee, WI
- Education: École Nationale Supérieure des Beaux-Arts; University of Wisconsin-Milwaukee
- Known for: Sculpture, Public Art, Site-Specific Installations, Environmental Art
- Notable work: Chiral Formation, (2012) Wheel of Time (2012) Nature Belle (2006), Flight (2002)
- Movement: Contemporary Art, Environmental Art, Photography, Land Art
- Awards: Wisconsin Visual Art Achievement Award, Milwaukee Arts Board
- Website: roystaab.blogspot.com

Roy Frank Staab (born 1941, Milwaukee, Wisconsin, United States) is an American artist.

== Early life ==
Staab was born in Milwaukee, Wisconsin, United States on September 9, 1941, the son of Roy William Staab, an artist, painter, and advertising designer. Staab studied painting and graphics at the Layton School of Art and the University of Wisconsin–Milwaukee. In the 1970s, he lived in Paris and Germany and traveled throughout Europe. From 1980 to 1993, Staab lived in New York City. He currently resides in Milwaukee, WI (USA).

== Art ==
Starting as a painter in the late 1960s and early 1970s, Staab's early works combined orderly geometry with disruptive natural forces. His sprayed watercolors explored water's staining properties and its corrupting effects on paper. Later, Staab wiped all color from his palette to focus on highly refined geometric line drawings on paper. In 1979, Staab took his art outdoors. In 1983, he created Ocracoke Cartouche, his first sculptural installation in nature and his first mature work. Using local materials, Staab constructed simple, interlocking geometric forms in the shallows of a tidal enclosure. Like much of his future work, the form of this sculpture floats parallel to the water's surface on vertical supports, allowing the reflection to multiply and complicate the form.

The stark geometric drawings of the late 1970s and 1980s foreshadow the rigidly geometric outdoor sculptures. His drawings are now made directly on the earth using reeds, branches and other local materials. Since 1983, he has worked exclusively in and with nature, making ephemeral environmental site installations that incorporate reflections and shadows, shifting light, and changing seasons.

Staab's creations are site-specific and made from local, renewable materials. Bridging land and sky, the scope of the work reflects the artist's arm span, his upward reach, his stride, his size and strength. The artworks devolve back into the landscape—seashore, river, wetland, or forest—after Staab's act of creation in a place is finished. In fact, his work is so vulnerable to wind and waves that sometimes he wonders when he leaves the site at night if it will still be there the next morning. His reed sculptures sometimes last a few months or they may be flattened before completion. One such example of this work is 'X' Intertwining, a public piece formerly located in Riverside Park in Milwaukee, Wisconsin, made of stinging nettles woven into ropes. It was constructed in August 2009 and designed to hang directly over a fire pit, over which it deteriorated over the course of three months.

Curator Nicholas Frank locates Staab as a second-generation Earthworks artist, and Staab's photographic documentations attest to the site- and time-sensitive environmental works that he has executed in various ecosystems. Staab's ephemeral sculptures are constructed from natural materials such as reeds, willow shoots and bamboo. Others include Spring Ring, a 2002 installation at the Charles Allis Museum, Nature Belle, and Shadow Dance, commissioned for summer of 2016 at the Villa Terrace Decorative Arts Museum.

Staab's creative process at a site includes his own performance, sometimes involving community participation. Staab gathers materials, creates, tends, and photographs his work, and offers direction and interpretation to participants and viewers.

Staab's first international show was the 1990 Summer Arts Festival of Jyvaskyla, Finland. Staab has since been invited to create installations in the United States, Canada, Brazil, Denmark, Japan, and Italy.

== Residencies, awards, and grants ==
Staab has been awarded a Wisconsin Visual Art Achievement Award, Milwaukee Arts Board Artist of the Year, Japan/American Artist Exchange Creative Artist Fellowship, residencies at the Sapporo Museum and Yokohama Museum of Art (Japan), a Pollock-Krasner Foundation Grant, Gottlieb Foundation Award, the Joan Mitchell Award, New York Foundation for the Arts award/Sculpture, New Jersey State Council on the Arts grant, and New York State Council on the Arts grant, among other honors.

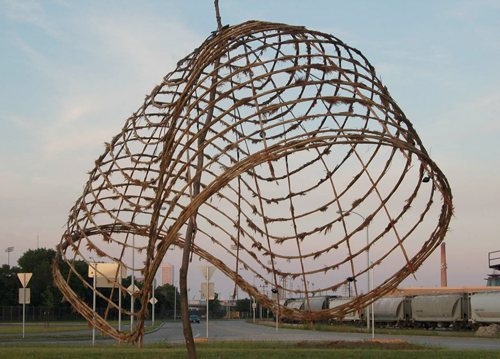
Nature Belle (2006)

Staab was a MacDowell Fellow in 1988.

== Photography, painting & works on paper ==
Staab documents each unique artwork, creative experience, and landscape with his own photography and videos. The photographs endure after the ephemeral artworks disappear back into the landscape. Photographs of Staab's work have been featured on the covers of "American Craft" and "Orion" magazines. Staab's paintings, drawings, and photographs can be found in the collections of the Musée d'Art Moderne and Fonds national d'art contemporain in Paris (France), the Metropolitan Museum of Art in New York City (USA), and the Milwaukee Art Museum (USA), Abington Art Center (USA), Boreal Art/Nature (Canada), Yokohama Museum of Art (Japan), Ripon College (USA), University of Wisconsin- Eau Claire (USA), and Vassar College (USA).
