= Nature Belle (Staab) =

Artwork by Roy Staab

Coordinates: 43°01′52.0″N 87°56′36.6″W

- Artist: Roy Staab
- Year: 2006
- Dimensions: 1,400 cm × 1,100 cm × 1,100 cm (45 ft × 35 ft × 35 ft)
- Location: Milwaukee, WI

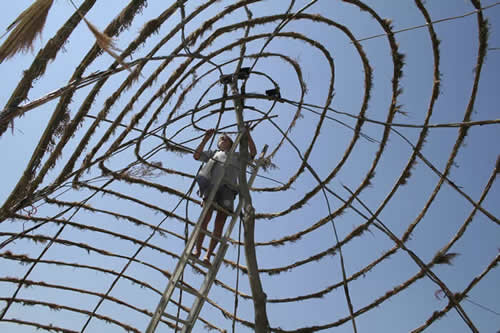
Roy Staab repairing "Nature Belle"

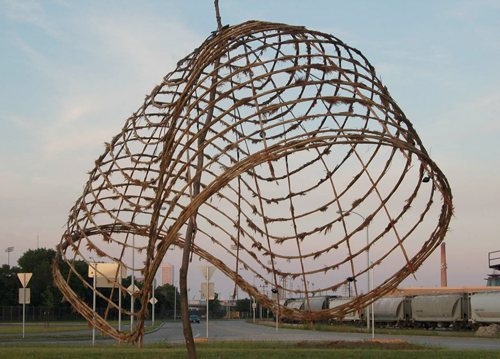
Nature Belle

Nature Belle, a public artwork by American artist Roy Staab, was located in the middle of a round-about at the intersection of the Hank Aaron Trail and 25th Street, near Milwaukee, Wisconsin. A site-specific sculpture constructed from natural local materials, the finished bell was supported by a box elder tree and was approximately 45 ft. in height and 35 ft. in diameter. Located in the center of a busy traffic circle, it was viewed mostly by passing motorists. Like most of Staab's ephemeral sculptures, the work is no longer extant. It was completed on June 6, 2006, and destroyed by a storm on September 8, 2006.

Staab's ephemeral sculptures are constructed from natural materials such as reeds, willow shoots and bamboo. His photographs are often displayed in galleries in Milwaukee, but it is rare for his home town to experience his outdoor installations. Others include Spring Ring, a 2002 installation at the Charles Allis Museum, and Shadow Dance, commissioned for summer of 2016 at the Villa Terrace Decorative Arts Museum.

== Description ==
"Nature Belle" was made of natural, organic, sustainable materials that were collected in Milwaukee County. The structure was completed by intertwining various types of willows and reeds and binding them with nylon rope. The sculpture was suspended from a Box elder tree that was approximately 45 feet in height. The Belle swayed and rotated freely from this central support. Karen Wolf at the Hank Aaron trail invited Staab to construct this site specific sculpture.

=== Condition ===
"Nature Belle" is no longer extant. The fragile structure was knocked down on September 8, 2006, three months and two days after its construction.
