= The Last of the Spartans =

Sculpture based in United States

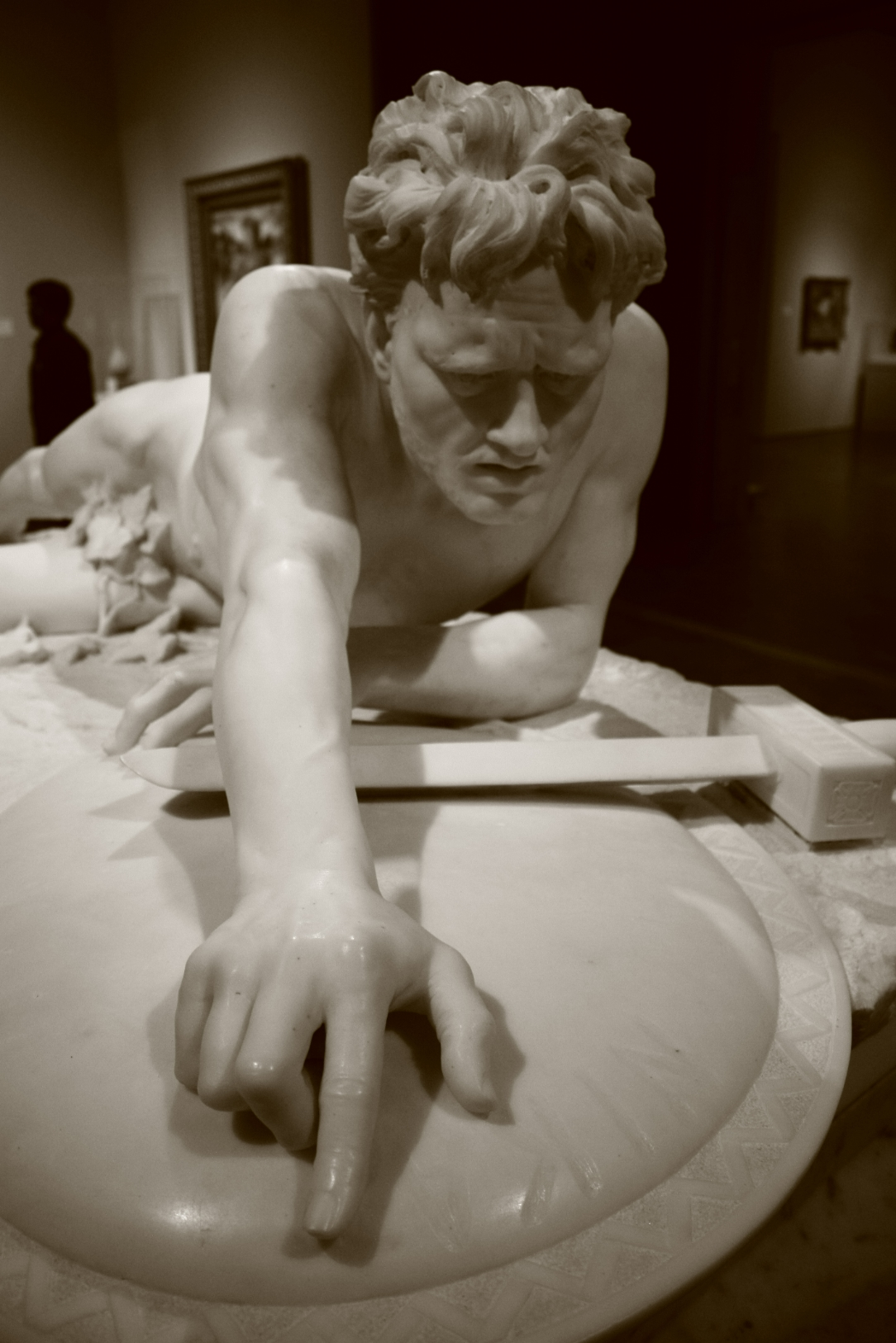
- Artist: Gaetano Trentanove
- Year: 1892
- Type: marble
- Dimensions: 66 cm × 200 cm × 69 cm (26 in × 79 in × 27 in)
- Location: Milwaukee Art Museum; Milwaukee, Wisconsin
- Owner: Layton Art Collection

The Last of the Spartans is a sculpture by Italian and American artist Gaetano Trentanove displayed at the Milwaukee Art Museum in Milwaukee, Wisconsin. The white marble figurative sculpture depicts a fallen soldier. The depiction of the figure is highly detailed and realistic. The work was originally exhibited at the World's Columbian Exposition in 1893.
