= John Arthur Yeates =

American artist (1923–1972)

- Born: November 2, 1923; Starkville, Mississippi
- Died: July 12, 1972 (aged 48); Menlo Park, California
- Education: Layton School of Art
- Style: Magic Realism

John Arthur Yeates (November 2, 1923 – July 12, 1972) was an American painter, active in Wisconsin and California. A student of Milwaukee artist Karl Priebe, Yeates adopted the Magic Realist style of his teacher, which he often applied to depictions of African American figures.

== Life and career ==
John Arthur Yeates was born in Starkville, Mississippi, on November 2, 1923, one of twelve children. His family relocated to Milwaukee, Wisconsin, as part of the Second Great Migration of working-class African American families from the rural US South to the industrial North. Shortly after settling in Milwaukee, Yeates enrolled at the Layton School of Art, notably studying under painter Karl J. Priebe. Focusing on Black life in the city, he displayed some of his works at the Wisconsin Memorial Union, in Madison.

Upon graduating in 1951, Yeates relocated to Menlo Park, California, where he continued to pursue painting and exhibited his works regularly in the 1950s and 1960s. He also taught for a few years at the People’s Art Center of St. Louis and had a solo exhibition there in 1957.

Yeates died in Menlo Park on July 12, 1972. He was buried in the Odd Fellows Cemetery of Starkville, his birthplace.
