= Le Père Jacques (The Wood Gatherer) =

Painting by Jules Bastien-Lepage

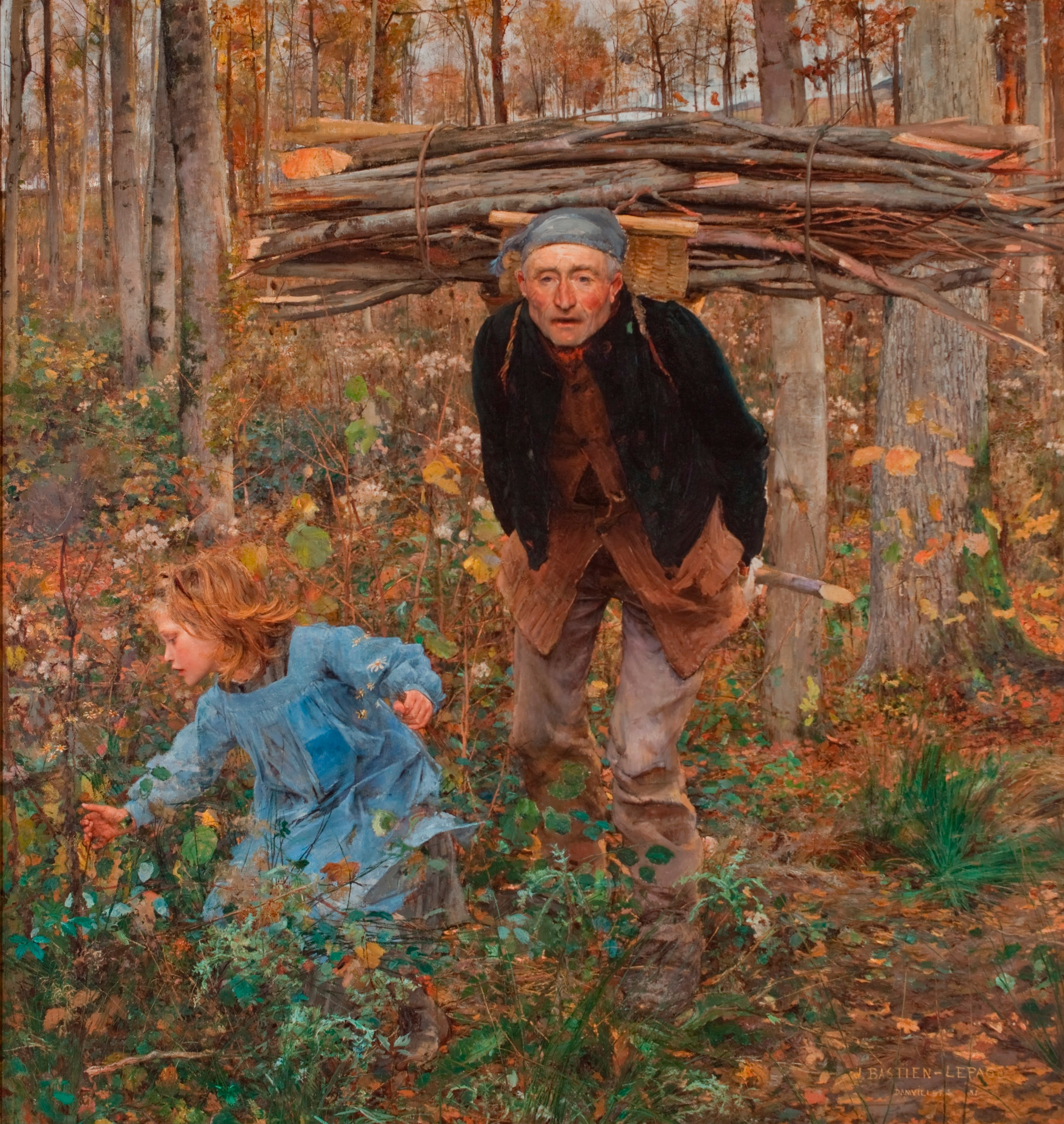
- Artist: Jules Bastien-Lepage
- Year: 1881
- Medium: Oil on canvas
- Dimensions: 196.6 cm × 181.6 cm (77 1/2 in × 71 1/2 in)
- Location: Milwaukee Art Museum, Milwaukee

Le Père Jacques (The Wood Gatherer) is an oil on canvas painting by the French painter Jules Bastien-Lepage, created in 1881. Exhibited at the Salon of 1882, in Paris, the work is now held at the Milwaukee Art Museum.

== Description ==
The painting is a genre scene which represents an old man carrying a heavy load of wood on his back, in a forest where a little girl precedes him, busy picking tiny flowers. The man was actually a friend of the painter's family and the child his granddaughter. This composition is constructed from several oppositions: that of the horizontal branches of the bundle carried on his back by the old man and the vertical trunks of the forest trees; that of the protagonists, the old man and the young child, with their postures varying between fatigue and joyful carelessness, and the dark colours of the old man's clothing blending into the décor, and the blue of the little girl's dress in a complementary shade with the orange present throughout the autumn undergrowth. The blue is already present in the sky glimpsed through the trees of the hillside. The palette is completed by the green leaves of the foreground, reinforcing a final opposition between life and death in the foliage, in the old age and the youth of the protagonists, like their gazes show, with the old man staring straight towards the viewer, and the child looking away, since she is busy picking flowers.

The painting seems to reflect the influence in the artist of both the impressionist painters and a more conventional academic approach to nature, which earned him critical acclaim.
