= Milwaukee Institute of Art & Design =

Private college in Milwaukee, Wisconsin, US

- Type: Private art school
- Established: 1974
- Endowment: $3.2 million (2017)
- President: Jeffrey Morin
- Faculty: 200
- Undergraduates: 885 (fall 2022)
- Location: Milwaukee, Wisconsin, United States; 43.031024°N 87.907813°W
- Campus: Urban
- Website: www.miad.edu

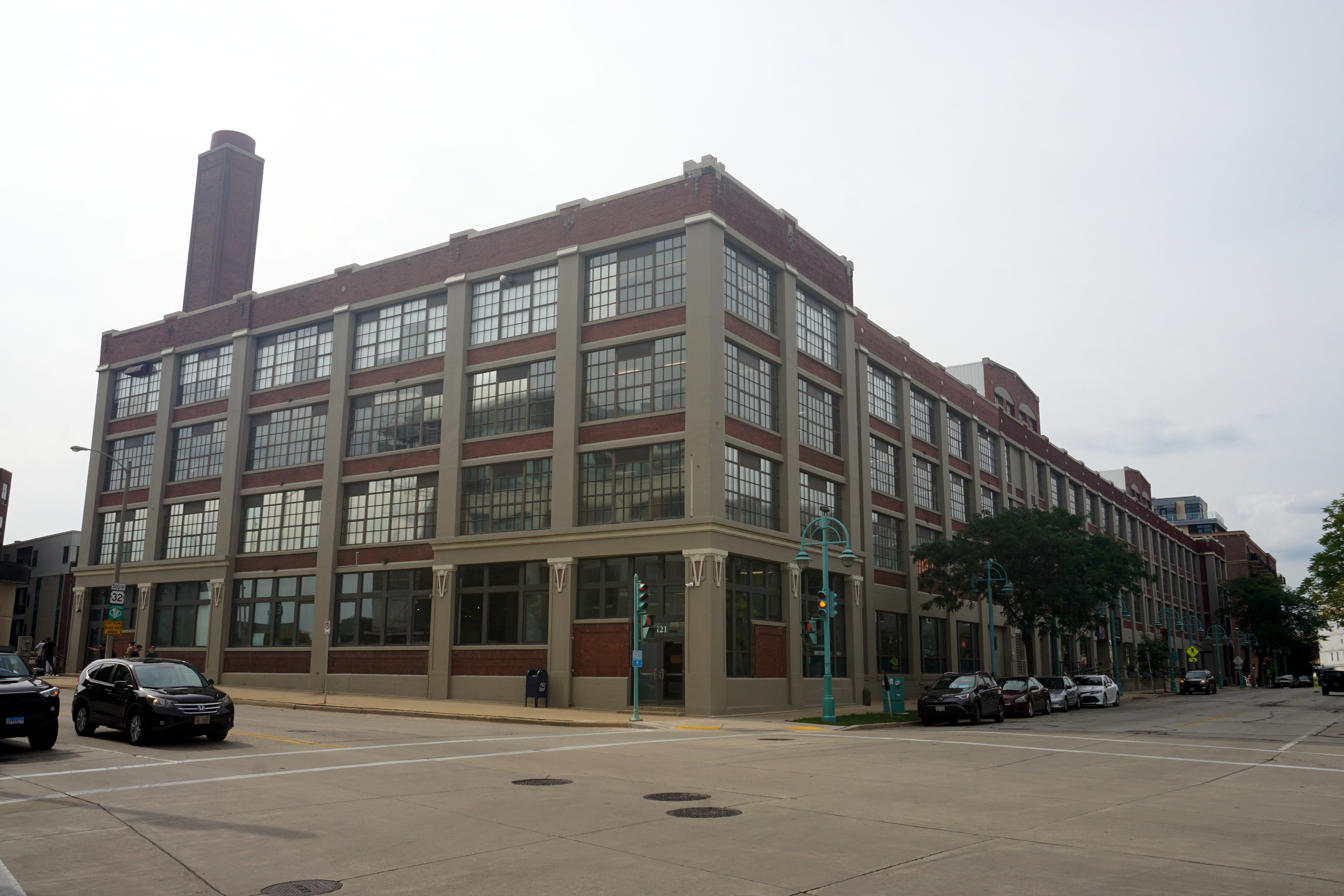
Milwaukee Institute of Art & Design building, the former Milwaukee Terminal Building

The Milwaukee Institute of Art & Design (MIAD) is a private art school in Milwaukee, Wisconsin, United States. Founded in 1974, MIAD is accredited by the Higher Learning Commission and the National Association of Schools of Art and Design. The Jane Bradley Pettit Building is the college's main academic building, located on the Milwaukee River in the Historic Third Ward.

== History ==
MIAD’s predecessor was the Layton School of Art. Layton was founded in 1920 by business and life partners Charlotte Partridge and Miriam Frink. The two women worked together from 1920 until 1954 when they received an unexpected request from the board tor their resignations "in the form of an ultimatum." The forced retirement came along with the boards appointment of artist and Layton School of Art graduate, Edmund Lewandowski as the new director. Lewandowski remained in a leadership position until the school closed under much duress. Investigative journalist Mary Lou Ballweg wrote a ten page article Layton: The Death of a School published in Investor Magazine that outlines the unionization of frustrated staff and mismanagement of funding that resulted in the schools closing called in 1974.

Upon closure of Layton, in 1974, seven faculty members co-founded the Milwaukee Institute of Art & Design. These included CW Peckenpaugh, Roland Poska and Jack H. White.

== Campus ==
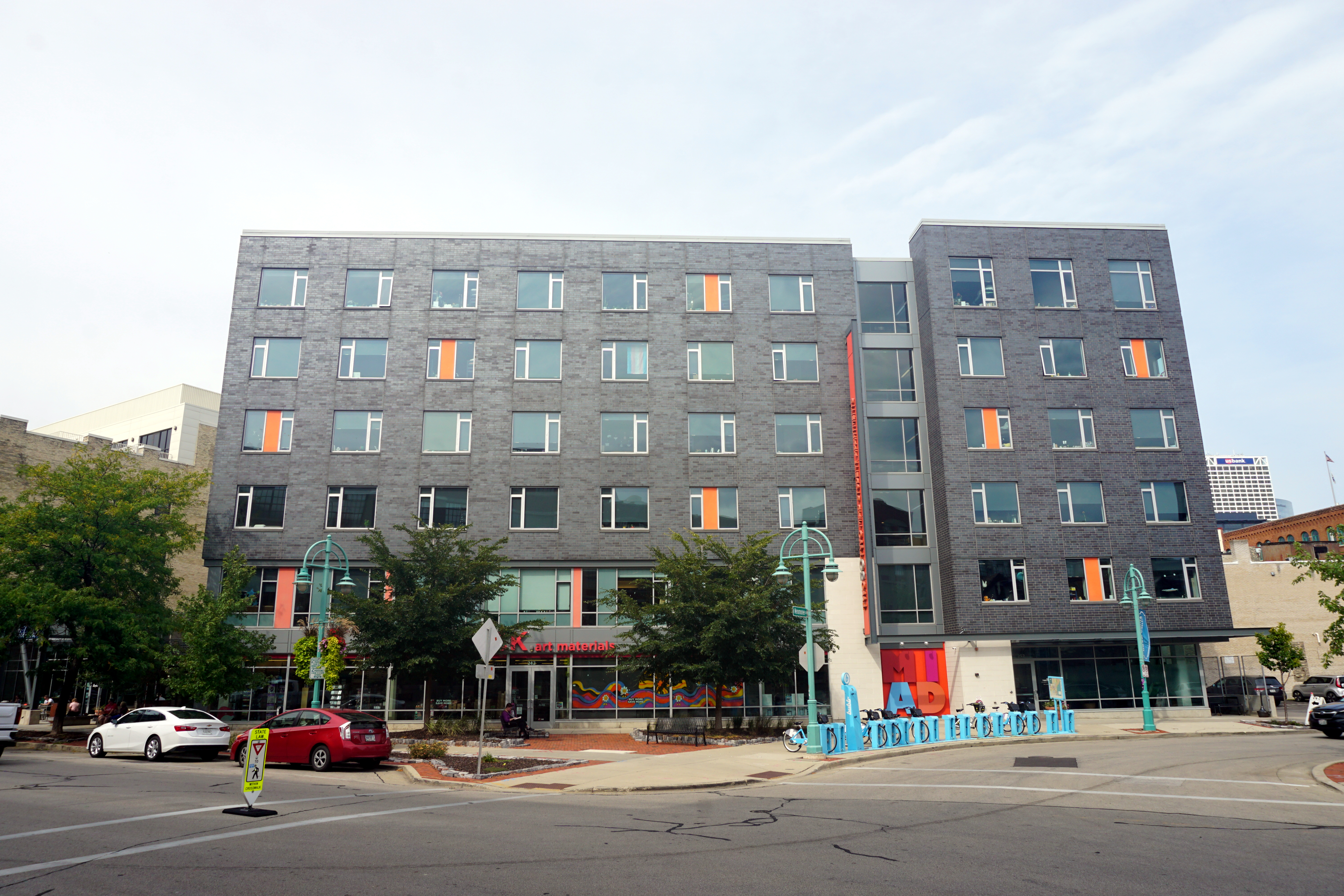
Two50Two MIAD Apartments

MIAD's campus is located in Milwaukee's Historic Third Ward, one of the city's arts districts, bordered by the Milwaukee River and Lake Michigan. In 1992, after a complete renovation, the college moved into the Jane Bradley Pettit Building. This is MIAD's main academic building, with 245,000 square feet (22,800 m^{2}) of space on five floors.

== Academics ==
The institution is accredited by the Higher Learning Commission and National Association of Schools of Art and Design. It offers an undergraduate Bachelor of Fine Arts degree in six programs and more than a dozen minors.

- Communication Design
- Fashion and Apparel Design
- Fine Art + New Studio Practice
- Illustration (Including an Animation Track)
- Interior Architecture and Design
- Product Design

As of fall 2023, MIAD had an enrollment of 885 students, which were 79% women and 21% men. MIAD's faculty consists of about 100 working artists, designers and scholars. The ratio of student to faculty is 15 to 1.

== Galleries ==
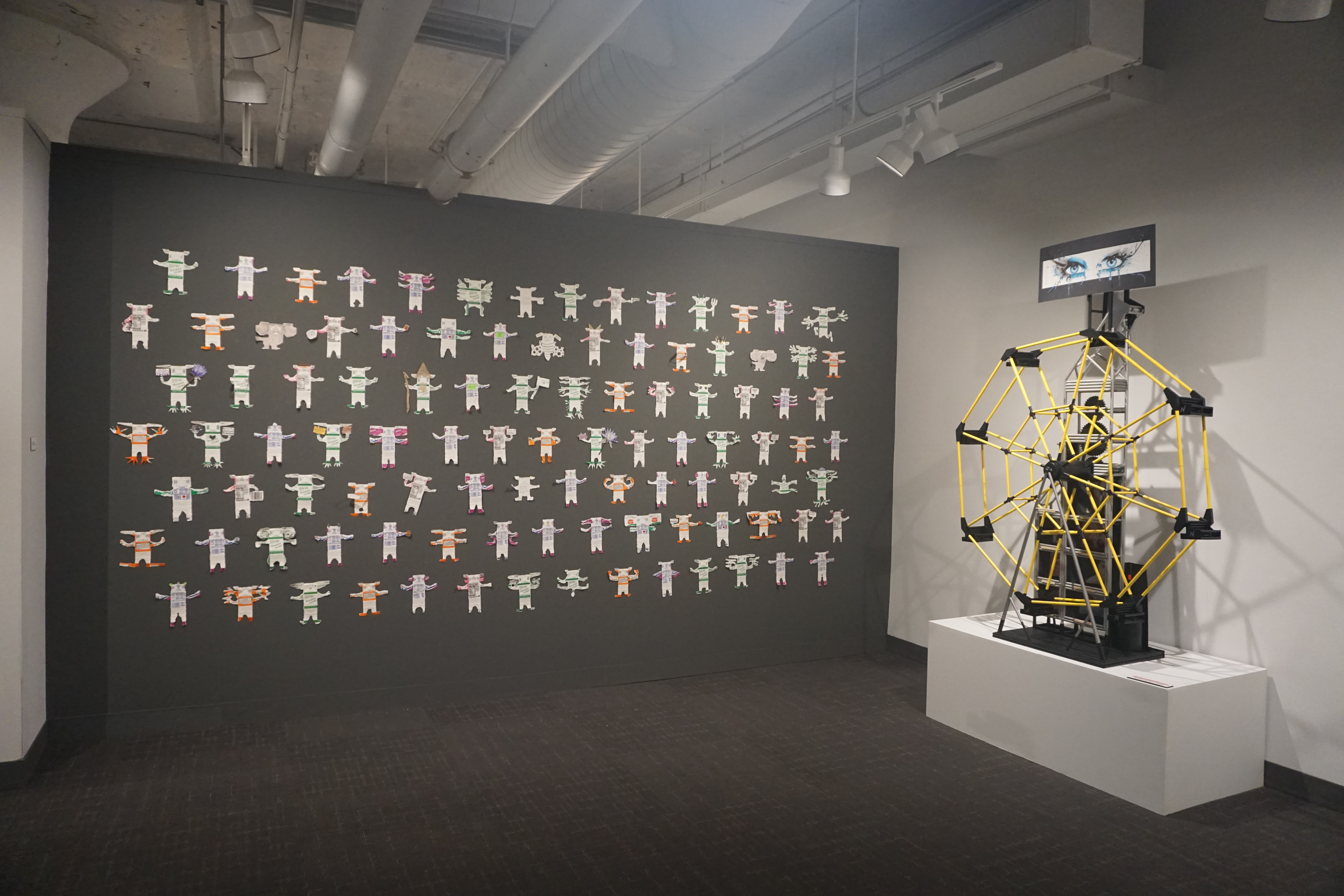
The Art Against the Odds: Wisconsin Prison Art Exhibition at the Milwaukee Institute of Art & Design

The Milwaukee Institute of Art & Design is home to two nationally recognized museum galleries that are open to the public and also hosts several auxiliary gallery spaces on campus which generally feature student work.

Jane Bradley Pettit Building

- Brooks Stevens Gallery of Industrial Design
- Frederick Layton Gallery
- Wallway Sculpture Gallery
- Perspectives Gallery

3rd Street Market Hall

- Gallery @ The Ave
