= Cardinal Vaughan Memorial School =

Catholic school in Holland Park, London, England

The Cardinal Vaughan Memorial School
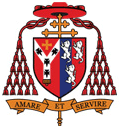

Location
- 89 Addison Road; Holland Park, London, W14 8BZ; England; 51.5040°N 0.2117°W

Information
- Type: Comprehensive, academy
- Motto: Latin: Amare et servire
- Religious affiliation: Roman Catholic
- Established: 1914
- Founders: Henry Fitzalan-Howard; Edmund Fitzalan-Howard
- Local authority: Kensington and Chelsea
- Department for Education URN: 141931 Tables
- Ofsted: Reports
- Executive headmaster: Paul Stubbings
- Headmaster: Adam Cosgrove
- Staff: 150
- Gender: Boys (11–18), co-ed (16–18)
- Age: 11 to 18
- Enrolment: 1030
- Houses: More; Mayne; Fisher; Campion
- Colour
- Publication: Sixth Sense
- Patron: Cardinal Herbert Vaughan
- Former pupils: Old Vaughanians
- School Song: To Be A Pilgrim
- Yearbook: The Vaughan Annual
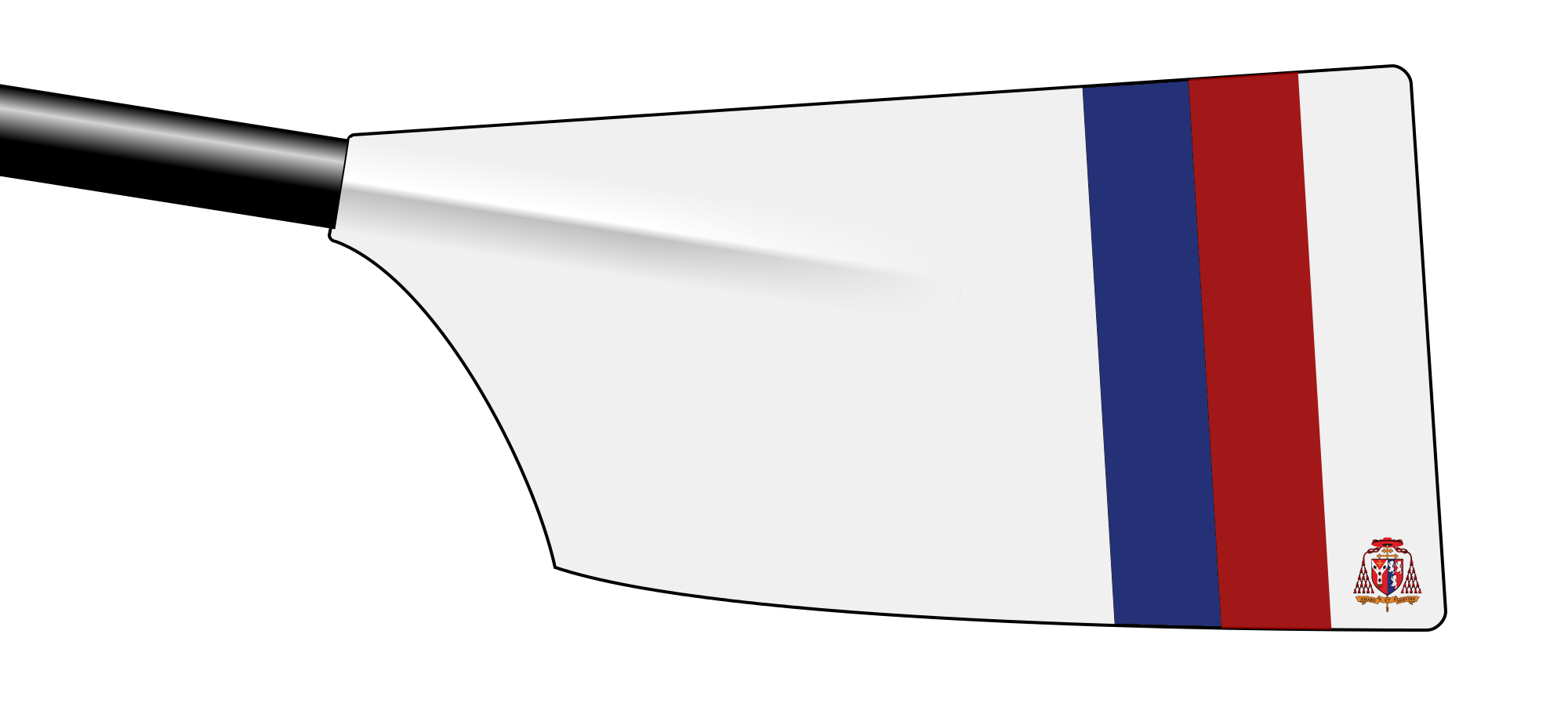
- Boat Club: The Vaughan Boat Club
- Website: www.cvms.co.uk

The Cardinal Vaughan Memorial School is a Roman Catholic secondary school and sixth form in Holland Park, London, England, with approximately 1,030 students.

== History ==
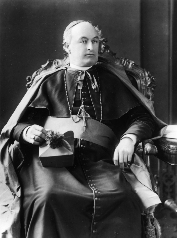
Herbert, Cardinal Vaughan

After the 1903 death of the third Archbishop of Westminster, Herbert, Cardinal Vaughan, an appeal was made to raise funds to found a boys' school to be named as a memorial to him; some £20,000 was subscribed. The Cardinal Vaughan Memorial School opened its doors in the Victorian building now known as Addison Hall, as a private school, to twenty-nine boys on 21 September 1914, appointing Canon Driscoll as the first headmaster.

In the 1920s, the school expanded and it was decided to seek recognition by the Board of Education for the grant as an independent day school. A piece of land, some 6 acres (2.4 ha) in North Wembley, was purchased for playing fields. In 1937, this plot was exchanged for the present site at Twickenham, adjacent to the international Rugby Football Union ground.

Enrolment had grown to 220 by 1928, and neared 300 by 1938. The school was evacuated to Beaumont College, Windsor, during the course of the Second World War. It moved back in the summer of 1945.

School fees were abolished after the war, as The Cardinal Vaughan Memorial School transitioned from a public school to a state-funded grammar school under the Education Act 1944. However, there were concerns about the low standards of new admissions, whose primary education had suffered during the evacuation; in 1948, Cardinal Griffin referred to this as a "time of crisis" for the school, though it was alleviated through a series of programmes to inspire the students' interest.

A new building was opened in 1964 to accommodate the growing enrolment. The school began to take pupils of all abilities in 1977. Girls were first admitted to the sixth form in 1977. The school became a voluntary-aided public school and drew pupils chiefly, but not exclusively, from Inner London.

In 1998, an article in The Observer described the school as "fast gaining a reputation as one of the top schools" in London, and the authors of the article added that it also was "one of the best in the country."

While nominally a state comprehensive, it has resisted attempts by local governmental and religious authority figures to widen the accessibility criteria for potential pupils. In 2009, the school was referred to the Office of the Schools Adjudicator as there were concerns that its admissions policy was 'elitist' and 'penalised the less devout'. The Schools Adjudicator ruled that elements of the school's admissions policy were "'unlawful' and 'unfair', and the school was compelled to change this.

The Cardinal Vaughan Memorial School was the highest-ranking Catholic comprehensive school in a table of A-Level results published on 15 August 2024 by The Times, compiled using data submitted by the 190 UK schools listed.

== Sport ==
The school fields seven Football teams and an equal number of rugby union teams. The school's athletes participate in regional and national competitions. Girls in the sixth form play netball.

=== Rugby ===
The school's home grounds are positioned adjacent to Twickenham Stadium, the home of the Rugby Football Union (RFU). The rugby season commences in September with trials for all age groups. All rugby teams play Saturday morning fixtures for the duration of the Michaelmas term. In addition to Saturday morning fixtures, senior teams are involved in midweek and cup fixtures.

Vaughan boys compete in many competitions across the country and against other schools, and also in annual House Varsity games.

Senior Rugby players also play Saturday morning and midweek fixtures during the Lent term. In addition to Rugby Union the school also enters various Rugby Sevens tournaments which generally take place during the Lent term.

=== Rowing ===
The school has the use of Barn Elms Boat Club, where boys can learn to row and scull. The school has produced Olympic Rowers.

=== Football ===
Football fixtures are played throughout the Michaelmas and Lent terms. Only the 1st and 2nd XI teams play Saturday morning fixtures during the Michaelmas term. The school's football teams are also entered in various local and national cup competitions. Games for these competitions are played midweek.

== Extra-curricular activities ==
Pupils founded a music society in 1935. Pupils may, at their families' cost, study musical instruments, including the piano, the organ (of which the school has four, including a Snetzler Chamber Organ on loan from the Henry VII Chapel, Westminster Cathedral), strings, brass, woodwind and percussion. There are also several choirs and orchestras: the Schola Cantorum, the Sixth Form Choir, the School Choir, the School Orchestra, the Concert Band, the Junior String Ensemble, the Senior Strings and the Chamber Orchestra, all of which give regular concerts. The school's Big Band has taken part in national competitions and has toured in France, Spain, Netherlands and the US..

=== Schola Cantorum ===
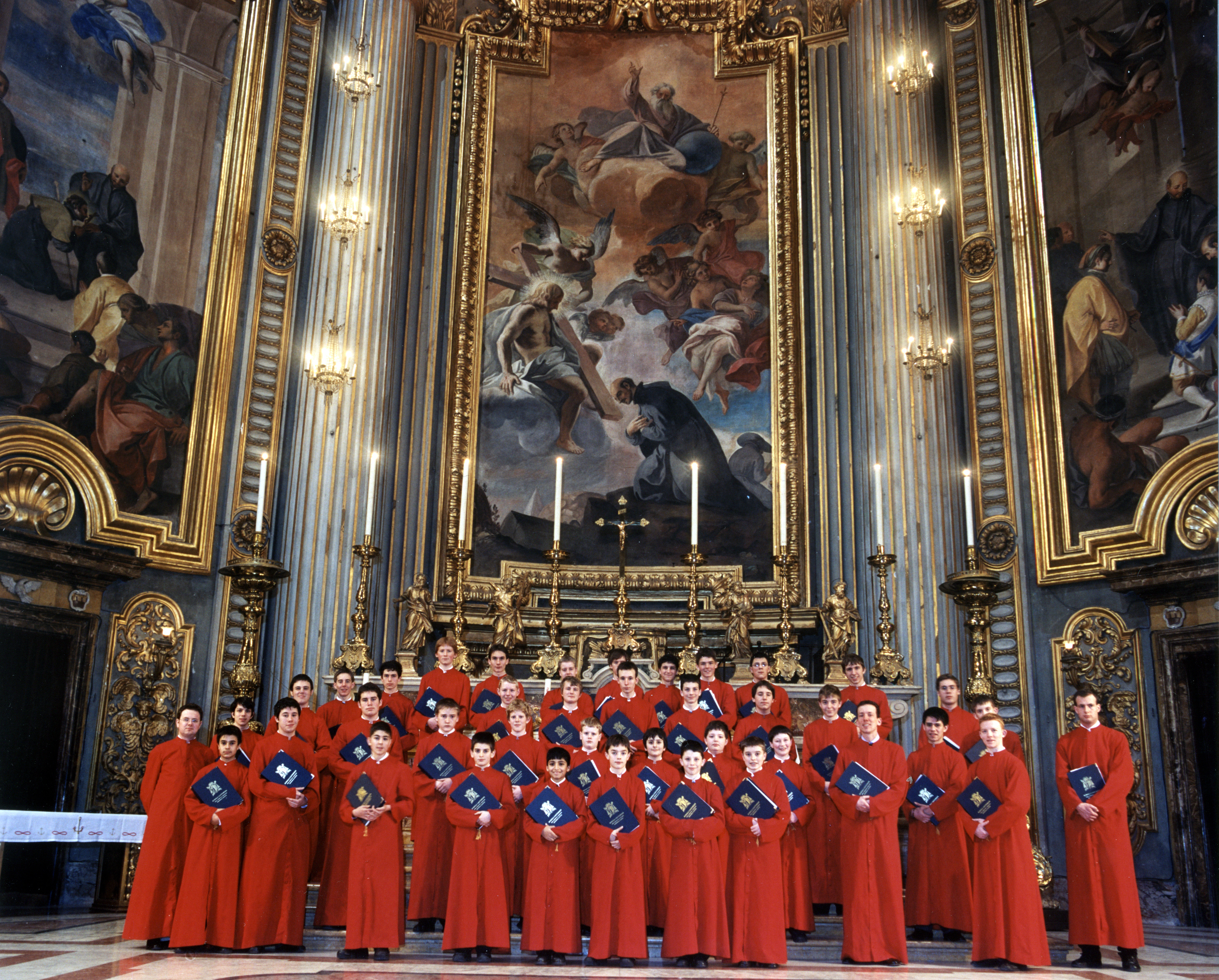
The Schola Cantorum at the Church of St Ignatius of Loyola at Campus Martius, Rome

The Schola Cantorum is the School's liturgical choir, founded in 1980 and made up of boys aged 11 to 18. The Schola sings at school Masses, and has external engagements. It has performed at many of London's major venues, twice represented Great Britain at the Loreto Festival in Italy, toured internationally, and performed before the Pope. It has performed with the London Symphony Orchestra, the Bach Choir and the Chorus of the Royal Opera, and been featured on film soundtracks including Harry Potter and the Deathly Hallows – Part 1, Life of Pi and Paddington. The choir has also appeared on BBC Radio 4's Sunday Worship, Vatican Radio, and the religious choral programme Songs of Praise on BBC television.

The Schola has recorded a number of CDs, including hymn collection Praise to the holiest, Christmas carol collection Sing in Exultation, and Lauda Sion by Mendelssohn and works by Dupré and others.

== Notable former pupils (Old Vaughanians) ==
=== Arts and entertainment ===
  - Roger Delgado (1918–1973), actor
  - Richard Greene (1918–1985), actor
  - Dominic Holland, comedian
  - Derek Marlowe, English playwright, novelist, screenwriter and painter
  - Joseph O'Conor, Anglo-Irish actor and playwright
  - Helen Oyeyemi (b. 1984), novelist
  - Jan Pieńkowski, author and illustrator of children's books
  - Richard Daniel Roman (b. 1965), songwriter and record producer
  - Oritsé Williams, member of boy band JLS

=== Athletes ===
  - Georgia Hunter Bell (b. 1993), duathlete, bronze medallist at the 2024 Summer Olympics
  - Martin Cross (b. 1957), rower, gold medalist at the 1984 Summer Olympics
  - Maurice Edelston (1918–1976), footballer and sports commentator
  - Garry Herbert, rowing cox, gold medalist at the 1992 Summer Olympics
  - Bernard Joy (1911–1984), footballer
  - Udo Onwere (b. 1971), footballer
  - Paul Parker (b. 1964), footballer
  - Kevin Gallen, footballer
  - Steve Gallen, football coach
  - Joe Gallen, football coach

=== Military ===
  - Paddy Finucane (1920–1942), RAF pilot during the Second World War
  - Donald Edward Garland (1918–1940), RAF pilot during the Second World War

=== Politicians ===
  - Jack Dromey, British Labour Party politician and trade unionist

=== Scholars ===
  - P. J. Honey, Vietnamese-language scholar and historian
  - Mark Langham, Cambridge University Catholic Chaplain
  - Gerard Lyons, British economist
  - Robert Bolgar, classical scholar, fellow of King's College, Cambridge
  - A. F. Shore, British Egyptologist and museum curator
  - Dan van der Vat, journalist, writer and military historian
  - Jack Lohman, Museum director
