= Milwaukee Art Institute =

Art museum and school in Milwaukee, Wisconsin

- Established: 1916; 110 years ago
- Dissolved: 1957; 69 years ago
- Location: 456 N Jefferson Street; Milwaukee, Wisconsin; United States
- Type: Art museum, Art school

The Milwaukee Art Institute was an American art gallery, exhibition venue, and art school in Milwaukee, Wisconsin. Established in 1916 by the Milwaukee Art Society, itself an offshoot of the Milwaukee Art Association founded in 1888, the Institute played a central role in the city's artistic life in the early twentieth century. It organized exhibitions of American and European art, supported Wisconsin artists, promoted art education, and served as a meeting place for other cultural organizations.

In 1957, the Milwaukee Art Institute merged with the Layton Art Gallery, another public art institution, to form the Milwaukee Art Center at the new Milwaukee County War Memorial on the city's lakefront. The Milwaukee Art Center was renamed the Milwaukee Art Museum in 1980. The Institute is regarded as one of the principal predecessors to the current museum, with a majority of its historical collection transferred to the new organization.

== Origins and development ==
The origins of the Milwaukee Art Institute date to the founding of the Milwaukee Art Association in 1888, the same year that businessman and collector Frederick Layton opened the Layton Art Gallery. In 1911, the organization moved into a purpose-built building on North Jefferson Street, immediately north of the Layton Art Gallery. Following the move, it adopted the name Milwaukee Art Society. Membership expanded rapidly, approaching 750 members by 1916, and the Society organized annual exhibitions of Wisconsin painters and sculptors while offering free art classes for children.

That same year, the Milwaukee Art Society was renamed Milwaukee Art Institute. During the 1920s and 1930s, it became one of Wisconsin's principal venues for contemporary art. The Institute emphasized rotating exhibitions, including displays of modern and avant-garde art from the United States and Europe, while building a permanent collection, with particular attention to works by Wisconsin artists as well as American and European painting. It also provided meeting and exhibition space for local artists' organizations and cultural groups.

From 1926 to 1941, artist and educator Alfred Pelikan served as director of the Milwaukee Art Institute while simultaneously directing art education for Milwaukee Public Schools. This dual role established a relationship between the Institute and the city's schools through exhibitions, lectures, and programming. The Institute also continued its annual Wisconsin Painters and Sculptors exhibition, which became an important showcase for regional artists.

== Merger ==
Following the Second World War, civic leaders sought to consolidate Milwaukee's major art institutions into a single organization capable of supporting a larger collection and expanded public programming. In 1957, the Milwaukee Art Institute and the Layton Art Gallery merged and relocated to the newly completed War Memorial Center, designed by architect Eero Saarinen. The combined institution was named the Milwaukee Art Center, bringing together the collections, exhibitions, and educational programs of both organizations under one administration.

== Collection ==
The Institute comprised a number of works from the personal collection of its first president, Samuel O. Buckner, as well as gifts from important Milwaukee collectors. Artists represented included Henry Ossawa Tanner, Hovsep Pushman, Robert Henri, George Elmer Browne, Jonas Lie, and Ernest Lawson, as well as Wisconsin artists George Raab, Emily Parker Groom, and Louis Meyer.

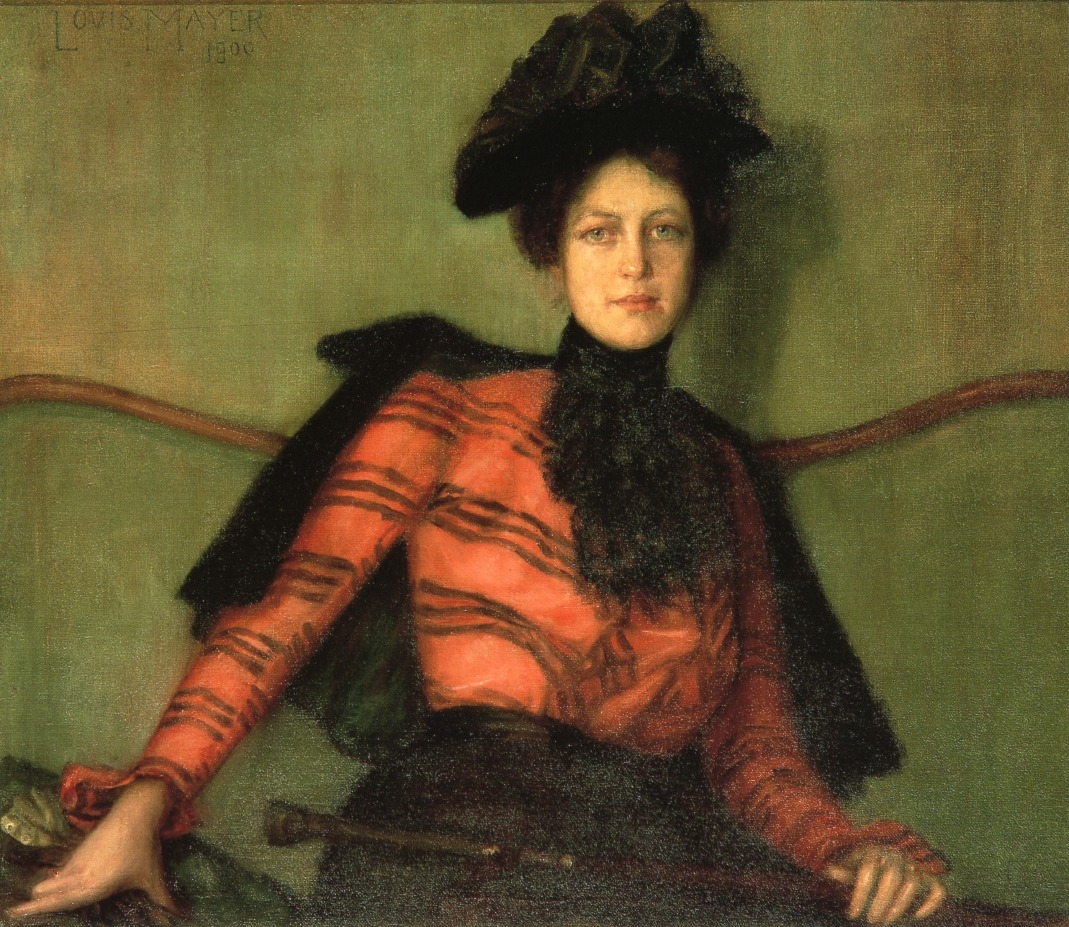
Louis Mayer, Lady in Black, 1900

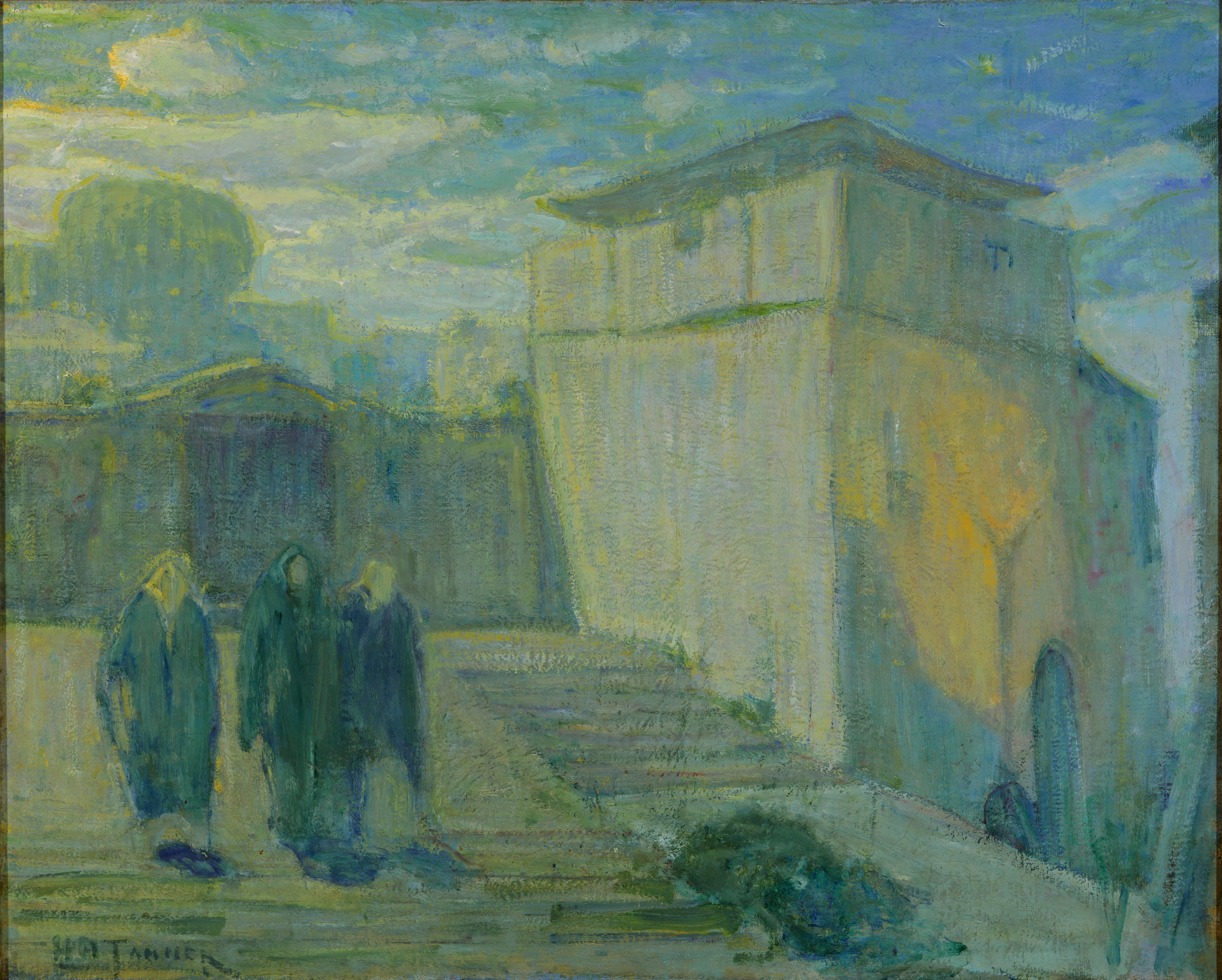
Henry O. Tanner, Moonlight, Hebron, ca. 1907

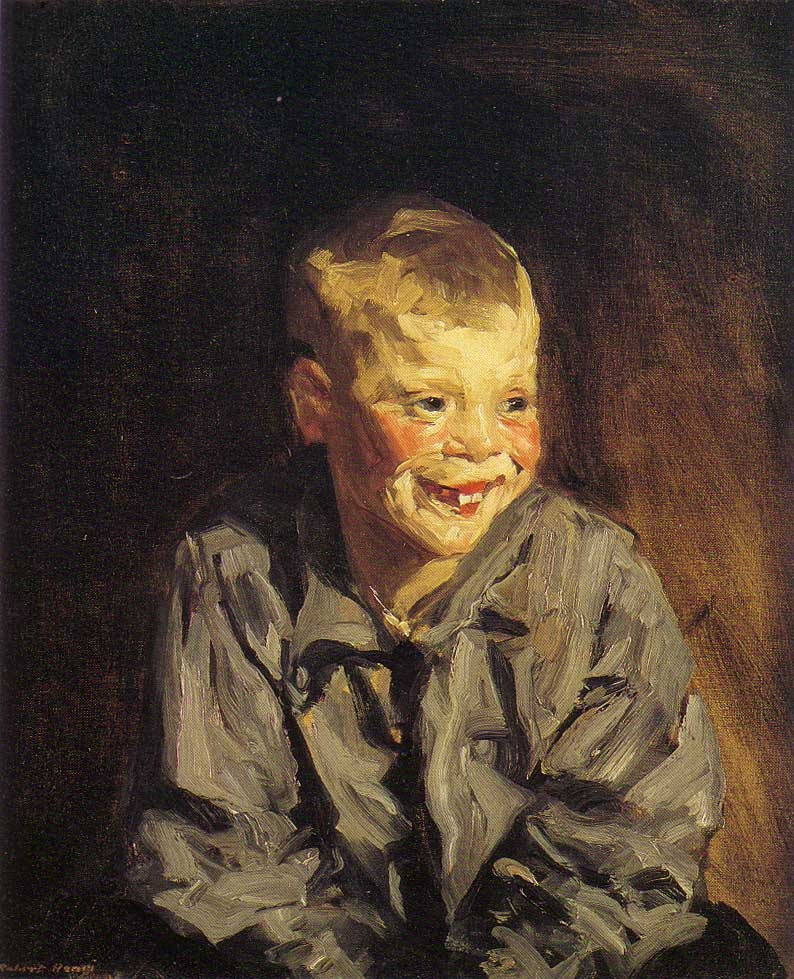
Robert Henri, Dutch Joe (Jopie van Slooten), 1910

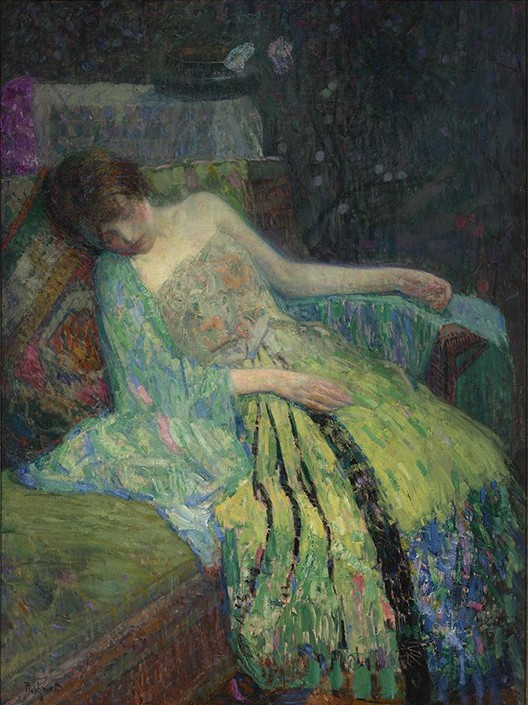
Hovsep Pushman, Hour of Rest, 1915

== See also ==
- Milwaukee Art Museum
- Layton Art Gallery
