= Samuel O. Buckner =

American art collector

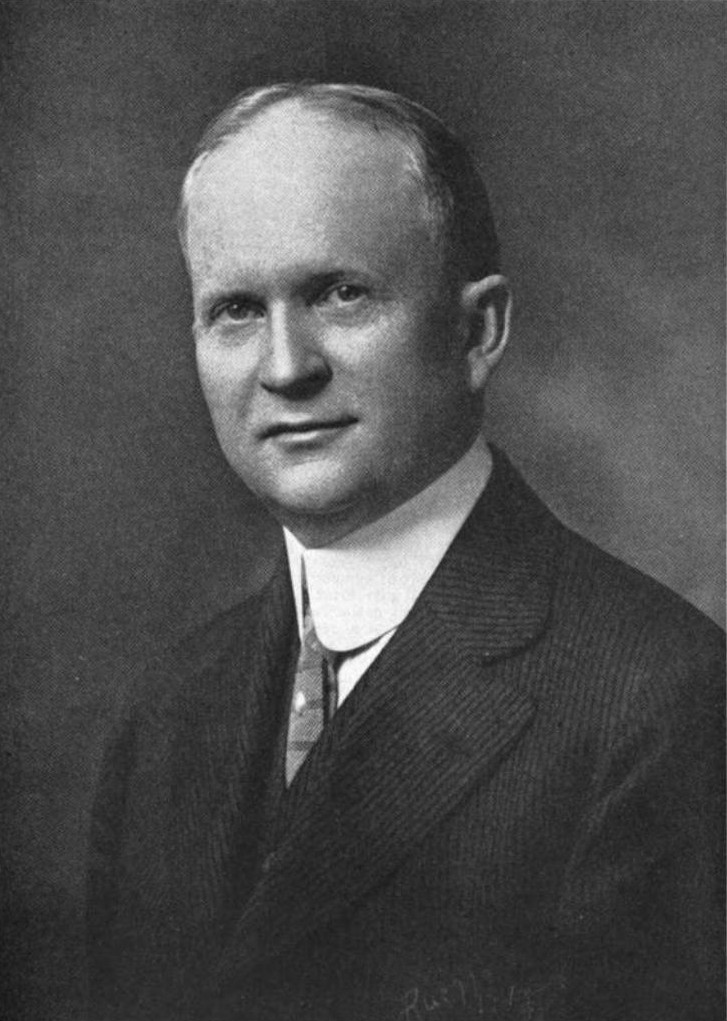
- Buckner, ca. 1920
- Born: Samuel Owen Buckner; April 30, 1862; Wellington, Missouri
- Died: November 10, 1945 (aged 83); New York City, New York
- Burial place: Forest Home Cemetery, Milwaukee, Wisconsin

Samuel Owen Buckner (April 30, 1862 – November 10, 1945) was an American insurance executive, art collector, and administrator best known for his leadership of Milwaukee's principal art institutions during the early twentieth century.

Although he spent his professional career with the New York Life Insurance Company, Buckner played a prominent role in the development of the Milwaukee Art Institute, served for many years as a trustee of the Layton Art Gallery and associated school of art. He assembled an important collection of American and European paintings, much of which later entered the collections of the Milwaukee Art Museum.

== Life and career ==
Buckner was born on April 30, 1862, in Wellington, Missouri, the son of Walker G. Buckner (1838–1901), a life insurance executive, and Margaret Ann Tully (1838–1885). His father relocated the family to Milwaukee in 1879 after becoming general manager of the New York Life Insurance Company for Wisconsin. Samuel Buckner entered the insurance business as a clerk in his father's office and, in 1894, succeeded him as head of New York Life's Wisconsin and Northwestern operations. He later served as the company's inspector of agencies.

In parallel, Buckner became one of the civic leaders associated with the development of Milwaukee's visual arts community. His principal contributions came through the Milwaukee Art Institute, of which he served as president from 1910 to 1926, a period during which the institution expanded its exhibition and educational programming, as well as public engagement. In addition to his presidency of the Milwaukee Art Institute, Buckner served as a trustee of the Layton Art Gallery. Layton trustees, in particular, oversaw acquisitions for the gallery after the death of founder and philanthropist Frederick Layton. The Milwaukee Art Museum ultimately emerged from the reunion of these two organizations in 1957.

Buckner moved to New York City in 1928 and retired from the insurance business a year later. He died on November 10, 1945, and was buried in Milwaukee's Forest Home Cemetery.

== Art collecting ==
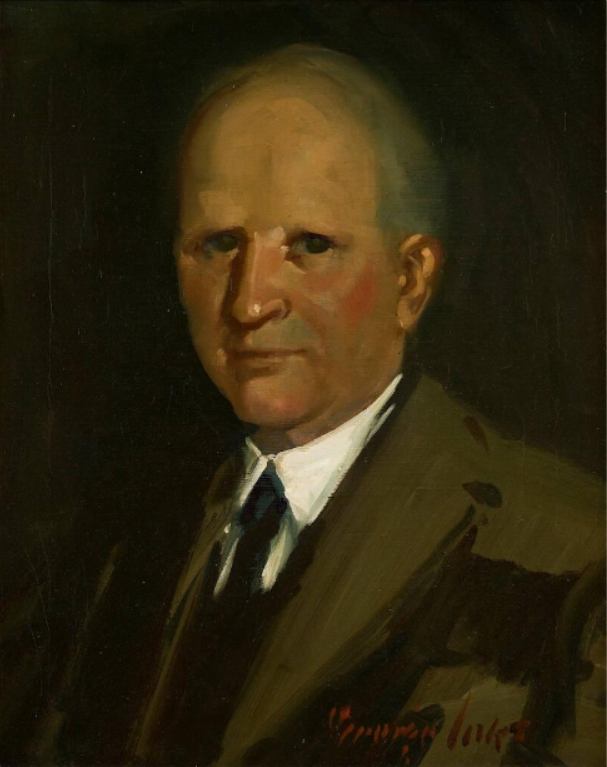
George Luks, Portrait of My Friend, S. O. Buckner, 1926

Buckner assembled a substantial private collection consisting primarily of paintings by contemporary American and Dutch artists. It reflected the tastes of many Midwestern collectors of the early twentieth century, emphasizing figurative painting and works by artists associated with European academic art traditions and the Hague School. Among artists represented were Joaquín Sorolla, Jan Hendrik Weissenbruch, and Charles Webster Hawthorne. In New York, Bucker also befriended a number of American Modernists, including Ashcan School painters Robert Henri, Jerome Myers, and George Luks.

Buckner frequently displayed his collection in Milwaukee's public institutions. He donated works to the Milwaukee Art Institute, notably Henri's 1910 portrait Dutch Joe, and bequeathed additional paintings to various Milwaukee institutions. More than thirty works from Buckner's Collection remain in the Milwaukee Art Museum today.

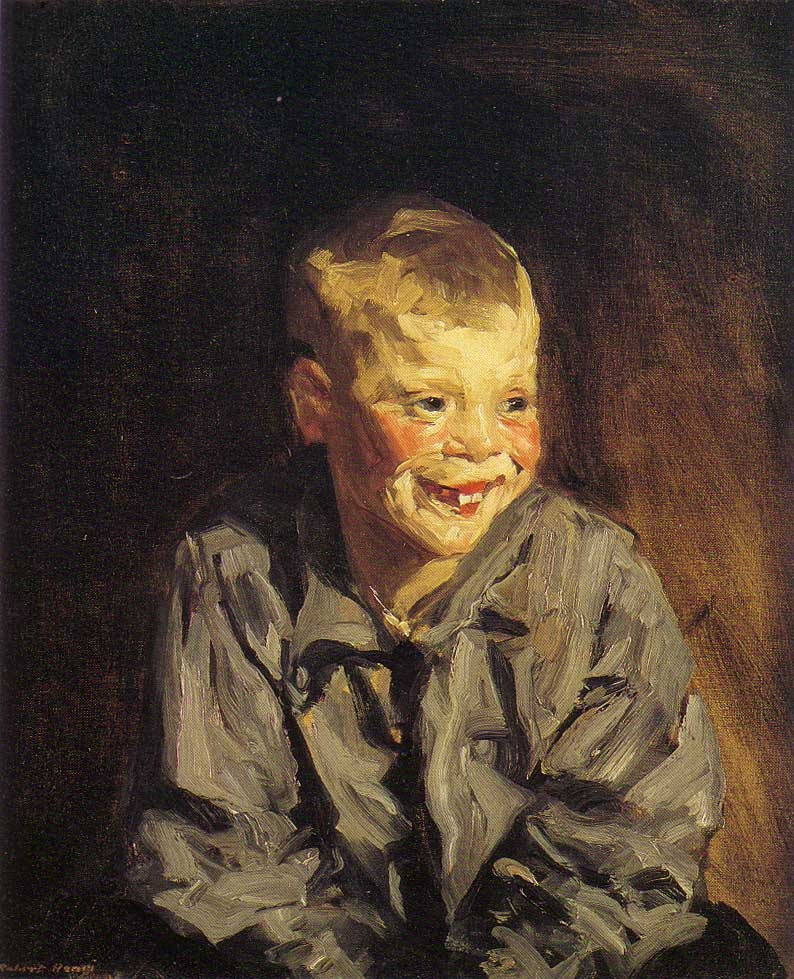
Dutch Joe (Jopie van Slouten), 1910

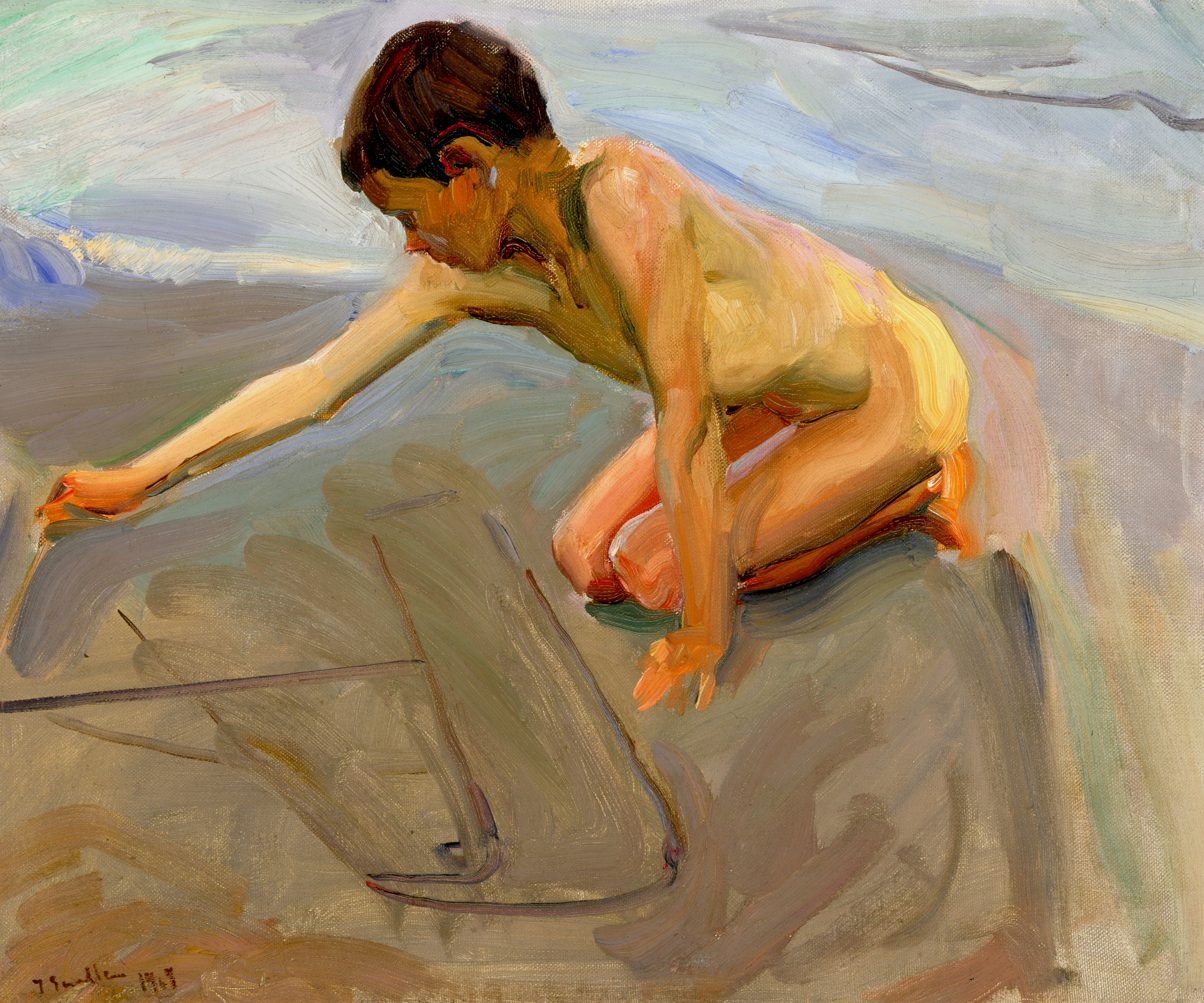
Joaquín Sorolla, Drawing in the Sand, ca. 1911

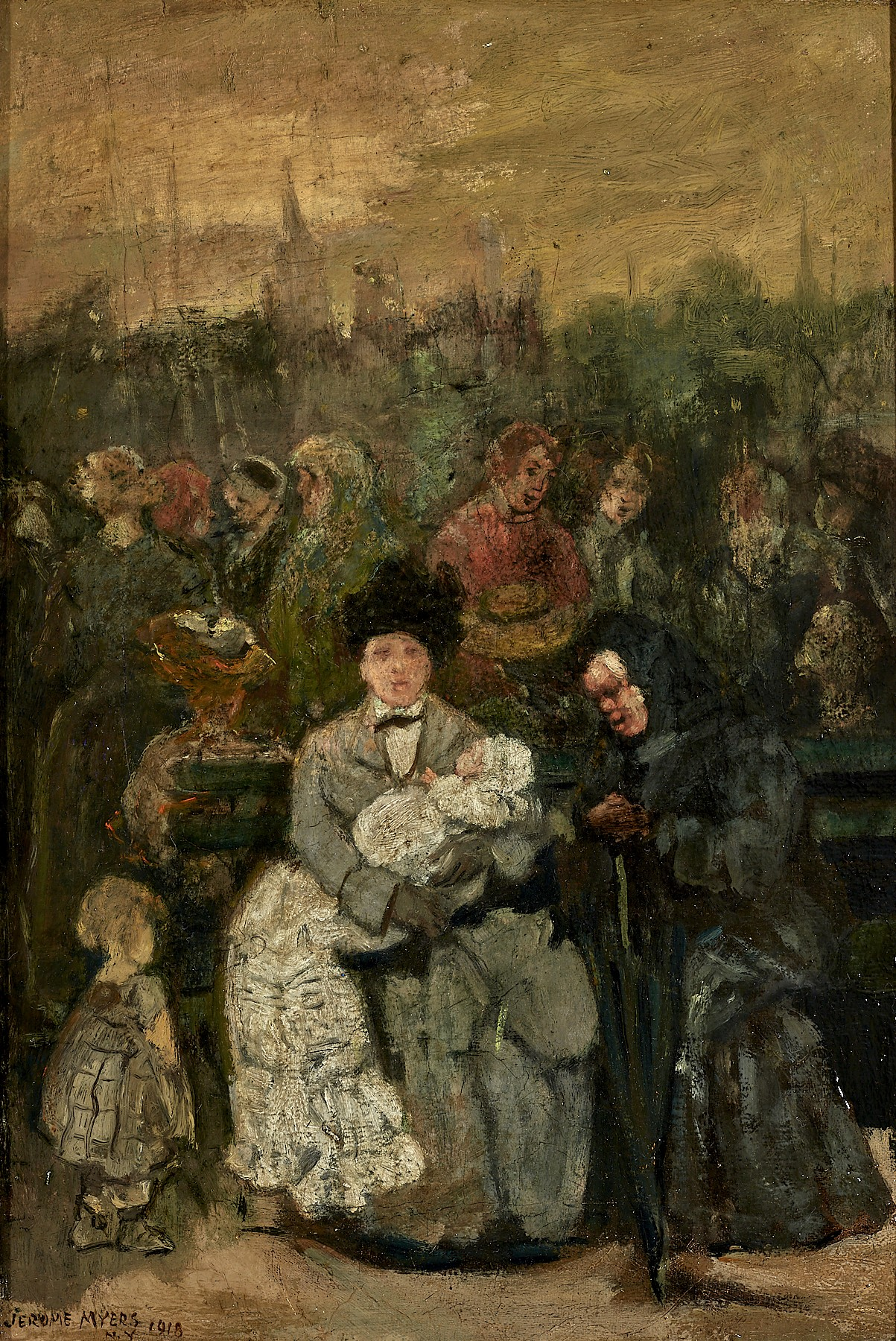
Jerome Myers, The Mother, 1918

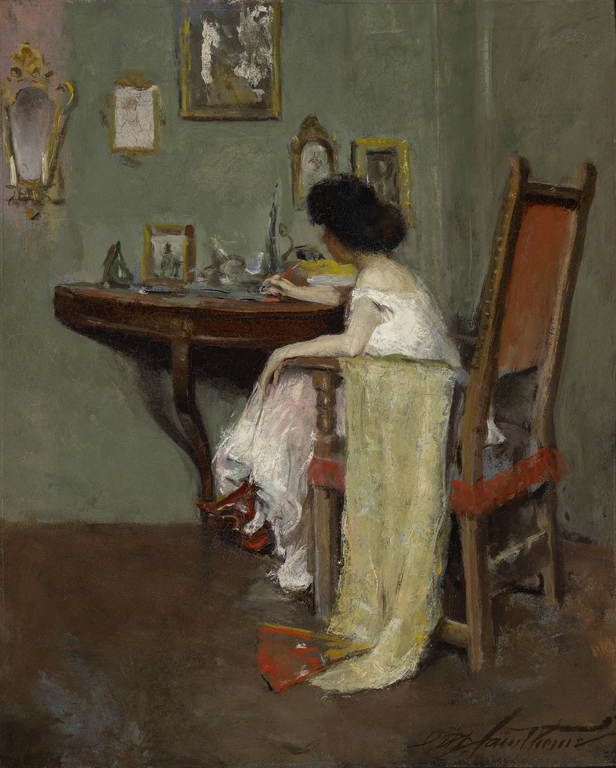
Charles Webster Hawthorne, In the Boudoir, ca. 1919

== See also ==
- Layton Art Gallery
- Milwaukee Art Museum
