= Cantata misericordium =

1963 composition by Benjamin Britten

Cantata misericordium, Op. 69
- by Benjamin Britten
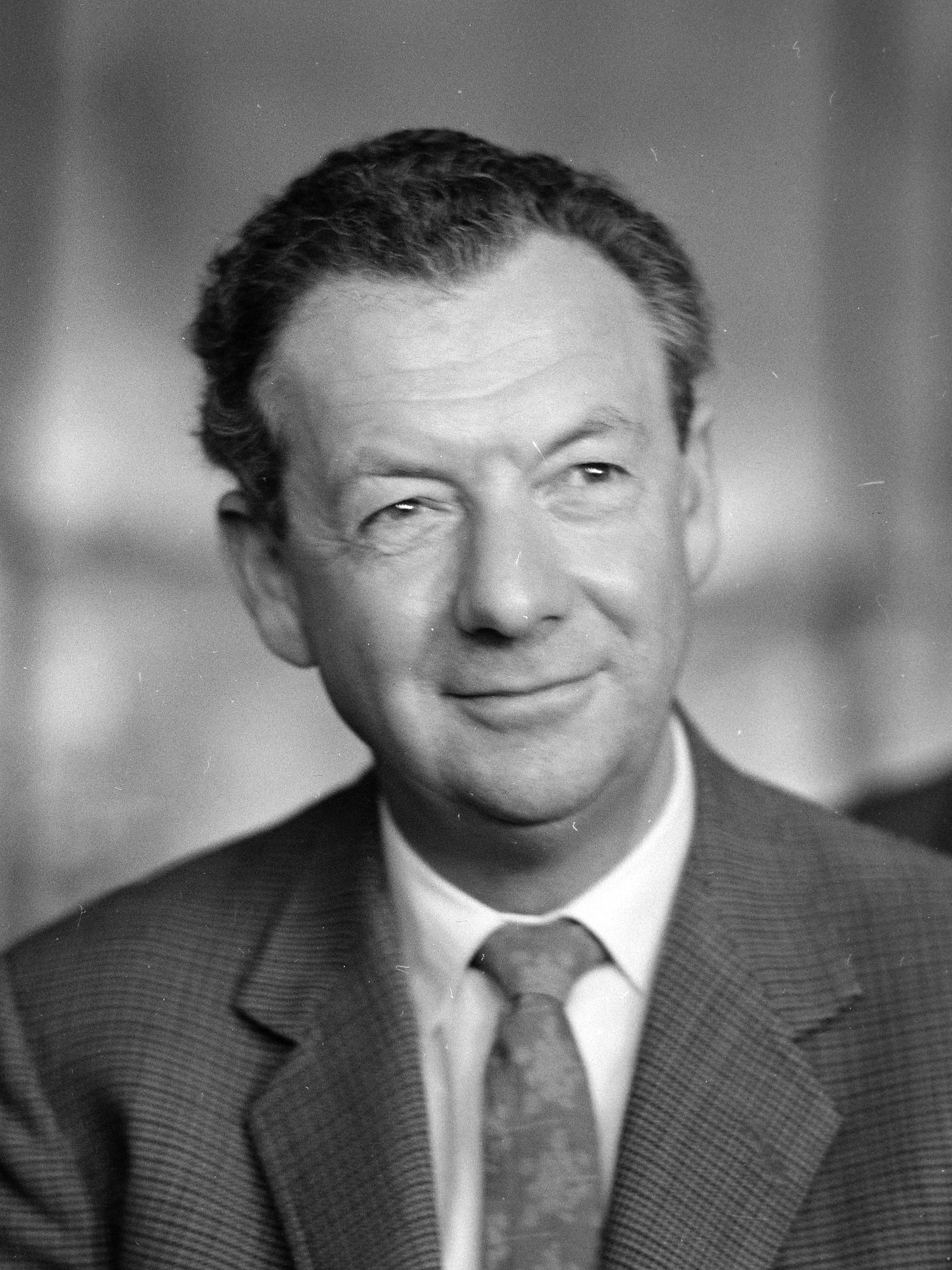
- Britten in 1965

Cantata misericordium, op. 69, is a 1963 musical composition by British composer Benjamin Britten. Its single movement is based on the parable of the Good Samaritan with a Latin text by Patrick Wilkinson, and was composed for the centenary of the Red Cross.

== History and text ==
This cantata was composed in 1963 for the centenary of the Red Cross.

The Latin text by Patrick Wilkinson recounts the Biblical parable of the Good Samaritan. Because the work was to be premiered at an international event, Britten felt that Latin would be the most appropriate language. He had originally intended to use either the Biblical text or a medieval adaptation, but the International Committee of the Red Cross objected that explicitly religious text would be inappropriate to celebrate an organization with a firm nonsectarian stance. To resolve this issue, Britten approached Wilkinson, a Latin professor at Cambridge University, to create a libretto for the work. The resulting text is "somewhat 'academic' and lacking in obviously expressive poetic qualities" but is notable for its "recondite, elegant, Classical Latin diction".

The work was premiered in Geneva on 1 September 1963 by soloists Peter Pears and Dietrich Fischer-Dieskau, with the Motet de Genève and the Orchestre de la Suisse Romande conducted by Ernest Ansermet. It was performed again at The Proms later that month, conducted by Britten himself.

== Composition ==
Cantata misericordium is scored for solo tenor and baritone, SATB choir, string quartet, string orchestra, piano, harp, and timpani.

The work is in a single movement with "a highly unified structure built up out of short interlinked sections". Its tonality is largely F-sharp major, but with a D in the bass.

== Analysis ==
Eric Roseberry describes this piece as "yet another minor masterpiece in which once more [Britten's] skill and science as a composer objectify his unique poetic sensibility".

Dean Jobin-Bevans suggests that Britten's compositional style provides for two potential interpretations of the work: pacifist, as with Britten's earlier War Requiem, and queer-positive.
