= Great Wilbraham Preceptory =

Former preceptory in Cambridgeshire

Coordinates: 52°11′47.86″N 00°15′50.34″E

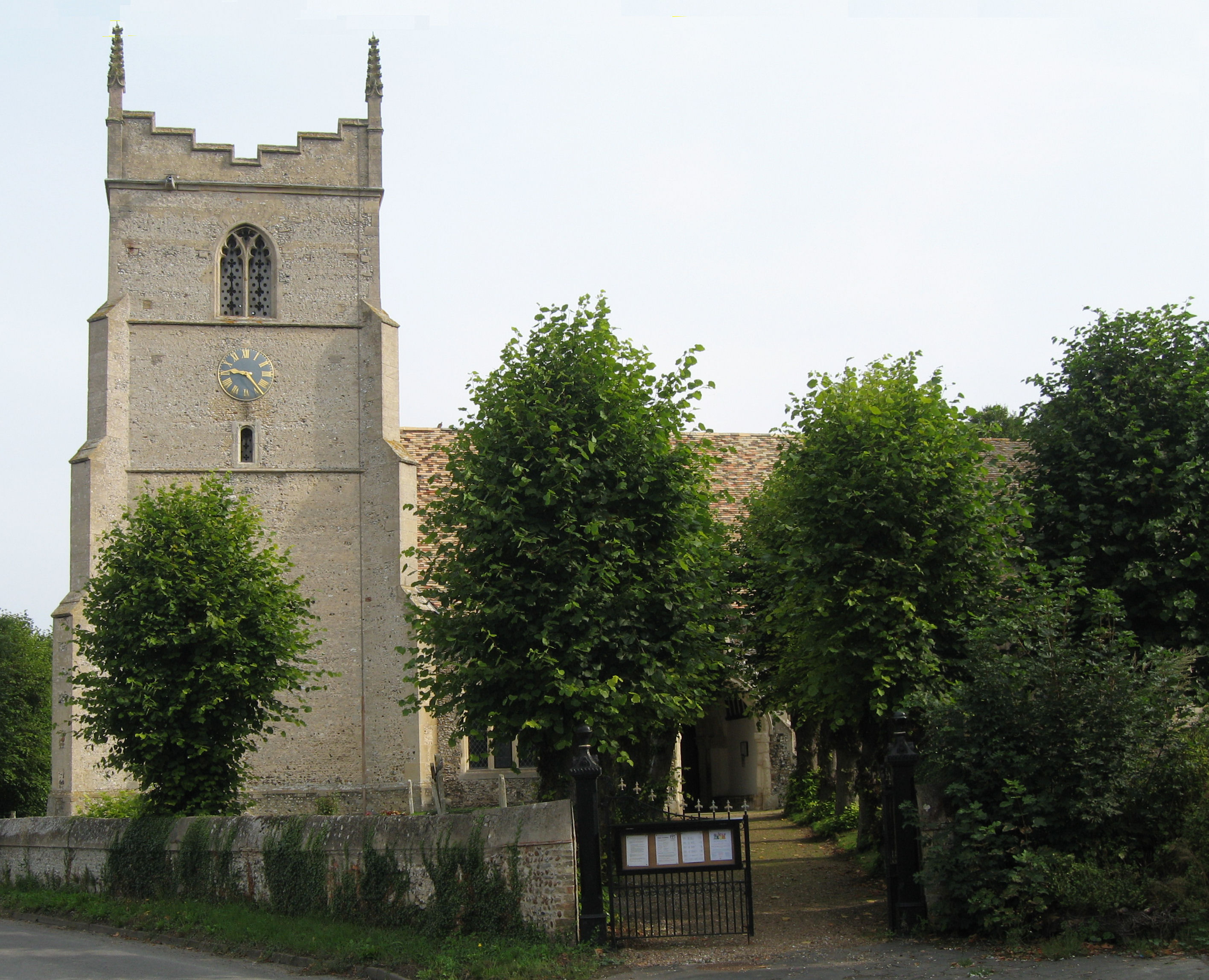
Saint Nicholas Church, Great Wilbraham

Great Wilbraham Preceptory is a preceptory in Great and Little Wilbraham, Cambridgeshire. Much of the Church of Saint Nicholas at Great Wilbraham dates back to 1226 when a preceptory was established here by the Knights Templar when the manor was given to Alan Martel, who was at that time Templar Master. There is a Templar tombstone hidden away under the tower and a Templar cross on the outside north wall. In the nearby village of Little Wilbraham, at Temple End, an Elizabethan manor house stands on the site of the preceptory. Previous to the ownership of the Templars, the lands were held by monks of Ely. At the dissolution of the Templar order, ownership passed into the hands of the Knights of St John of Jerusalem.

== See also ==
- Knights Templar in England
