= Patrick Wilkinson =

English classical scholar

Lancelot Patrick Wilkinson (1 June 1907 – 23 April 1985) was an English classical scholar, a don at the University of Cambridge and Dean of King's College.

During the Second World War, Wilkinson worked for Bletchley Park, the Allied code-breaking centre, and was posted overseas.

== Early life ==
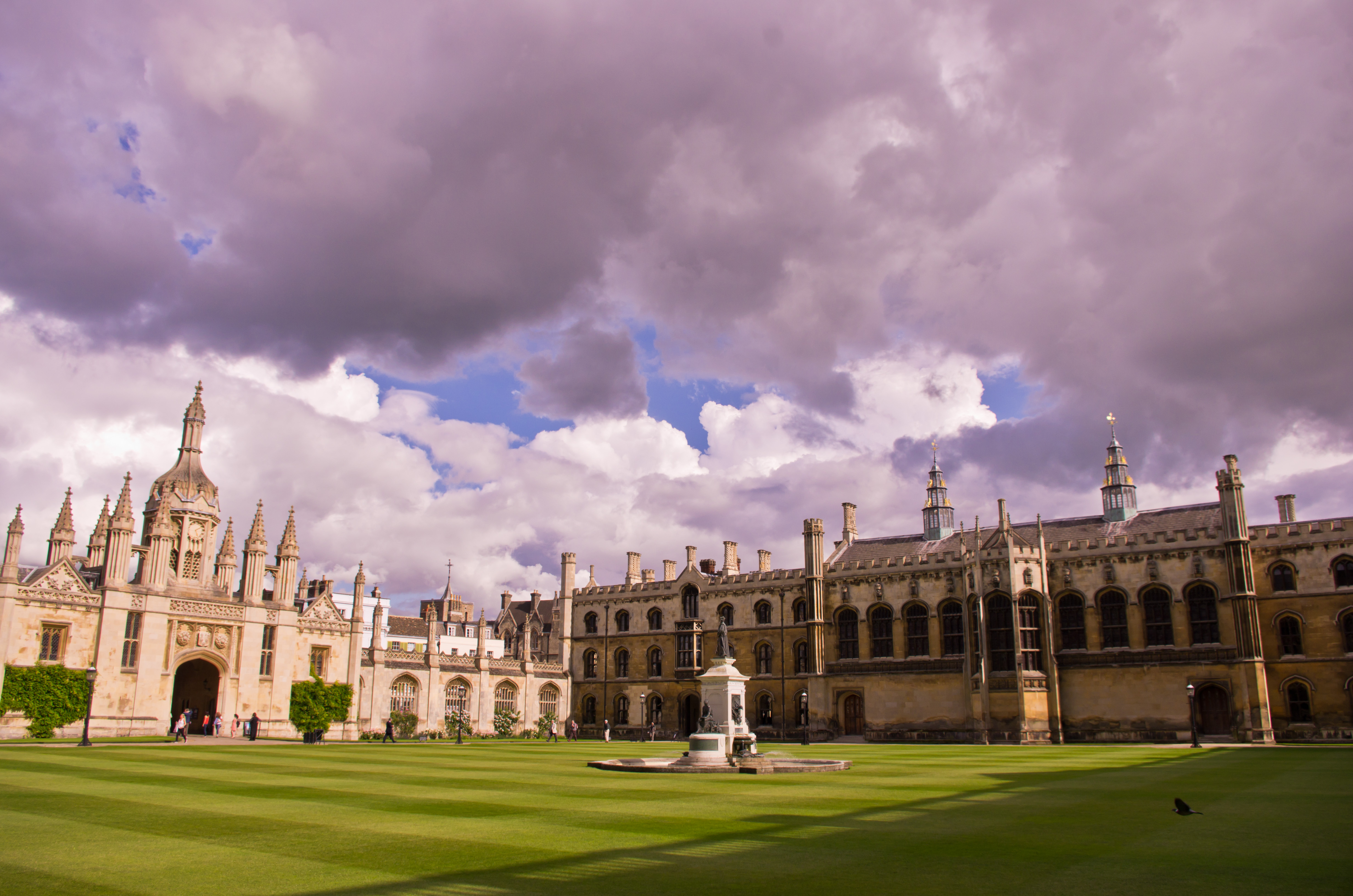
King's College, Cambridge

Wilkinson was educated at Charterhouse School and King's College, Cambridge, and not long after graduating was elected as a fellow of his college.

In 1938, F. E. Adcock introduced Wilkinson to Alastair Denniston, head of the Government Code and Cypher School, and when Britain declared war on Germany in October 1939, Wilkinson was one of the first new recruits to GC&CS, together with another Cambridge man, Harry Hinsley. When seeking to recruit more suitably advanced linguists, John Tiltman turned to Wilkinson for advice, and he suggested asking Lord Lindsay of Birker, of Balliol College, Oxford, S. W. Grose, and Martin Charlesworth, of St John's College, Cambridge, to recommend classical scholars or applicants to their colleges.

Until 1943, Wilkinson worked in the Italian naval subsection. In March 1943, after the success of Operation Torch, he was posted to Algiers in French North Africa, and then to Malta, where he worked in the Lascaris Battery.

After the war, Wilkinson returned to Cambridge as a Fellow of King's College and was also Reader in Latin Literature in the university. His major publications include Horace and his Lyric Poetry and The Georgics of Virgil. He published a memoir of Sir John Sheppard.

A reviewer said of his Ovid Recalled (1955) "Mr Wilkinson’s approach is almost unfashionable. It is purely literary; he offers no glittering fantasies or jerks of invention, but is content to let Ovid be his own interpreter."

In 1963, Wilkinson wrote the libretto in Latin for Benjamin Britten’s Cantata Misericordium, having been suggested to Britten by L. P. Hartley, who was also a fellow of King's.

With his friend Robert Bolgar, between 1969 and 1977 Wilkinson organised a series of international conferences at Cambridge with the title "Classical Influences on European Culture". He became Dean of King's College.

Wilkinson died in Cambridge in April 1985, leaving an estate valued at £97,206.

== Selected publications ==
- Ovid Recalled (Cambridge: Cambridge University Press, 1955)
- Horace and his Lyric Poetry (Cambridge: Cambridge University Press, 1951)
- The Georgics of Virgil: a Critical Survey (London: Cambridge University Press, 1969)
- Golden Latin Artistry (Cambridge: Cambridge University Press, 1963)
- Kingsmen of a Century: 1873–1972 (Cambridge: King's College, 1980),
- A Century of King’s 1873–1972 (Cambridge: King's College, 1980)
- Le Keux's Engravings of Victorian Cambridge (Cambridge: Cambridge University Press, 1981) ISBN 9780521303507
- 'The Augustan Rules for Dactylic Verse', Classical Quarterly 34 (1940), 30–43
- 'Greek Influence on the Poetry of Ovid' in L'influence grecque sur la poésie latine de Catulle à Ovide (1953), 223–243
- 'Pindar and the Proem to the Third Georgic', in W. Wimmel ed., Forschungen zur römischen Literatur: Festschrift zum 60 (1970)
