= Marc Bircham =

Canadian soccer player

Personal information
- Full name: Marc Stephen John Bircham
- Date of birth: 11 May 1978 (age 48)
- Place of birth: Wembley, England
- Positions: Defender; defensive midfielder

Senior career*
Years	Team	Apps	(Gls)
1996–2002	Millwall	104	(3)
2002–2007	Queens Park Rangers	152	(7)
2007–2009	Yeovil Town	16	(0)
Total		272	(10)

International career
1999–2004	Canada	17	(1)

Managerial career
- 2009: Queens Park Rangers (caretaker)
- 2021: Waterford
Medal record
Representing Canada
Men's soccer
CONCACAF Gold Cup
Winner	2000 United States
- * Club domestic league appearances and goals

Marc Stephen John Bircham (born 11 May 1978) is a former soccer player. Born in England, he represented Canada at international level. He was recently assistant coach at Serie A club Como, but left in 2023

== Club career ==
London-born Bircham started his professional career at Millwall and after 6 seasons joined Queens Park Rangers where he became a crowd favorite. Bircham used to be known for his unusual hairstyle – a dyed blue and white streak down the centre of his hair from when he played for QPR and a red and white streak while playing for Canada. QPR fans sang a song to the tune of "I Love You, Baby": "We love you, Bircham/ because you got blue hair/ We love you, Bircham/ because you're everywhere/ We love you, Bircham/ because you're Rangers through and through."

In 2007, he moved to Yeovil Town. He scored his first and what turned out to be only goal for Yeovil against Brentford in the Football League Trophy. After a series of ankle injuries in the 2008–09 season it was revealed that Bircham had quit football and is going to set up a youth coaching camp in Cyprus.

== International career ==
Bircham was eligible to play for Canada because one of his grandfathers was born in Winnipeg. He made his debut for Canada in an April 1999 friendly match against Northern Ireland in Belfast. He is the only player to have played for a country without actually visiting it when his first cap – as well as his first and only goal – came. He scored that goal only 8 minutes after coming on as a substitute for another player making his debut, Davide Xausa.

Bircham earned 17 caps for his adopted country, representing Canada in two FIFA World Cup qualification matches. His final international was a June 2004 World Cup qualification match against Belize.

== Managerial career ==
=== QPR ===
After becoming a QPR youth coach at the start of the 2009–10 season, he was put in temporary charge with fellow Youth Coach Steve Gallen due to manager Jim Magilton's suspension on 9 December 2009. The duo took charge of a 2–2 draw away to West Bromwich Albion on 14 December 2009.

=== Waterford ===
On 12 May 2021, Bircham was named manager of League of Ireland Premier Division side Waterford until the end of the season. With Waterford bottom of the table when Bircham took over, he led his side to 6 wins and a draw from his first 12 league games in charge, taking the club out of the relegation zone and earning a new 2 1/2-year contract which was announced in August 2021. On 23 November 2021, Bircham was sacked by Waterford, having learned of the news on Twitter without being contacted by the club following a text exchange between himself and owner Richard Forrest the previous night in which Forrest suspended Bircham for a week, preventing him from taking charge of the club's crucial Promotion/relegation play-off final against UCD.

=== Como ===
In the summer of 2022, he was appointed as first team coach of Italian Serie B side Como under manager Giacomo Gattuso, but left in 2023.

== Career statistics ==
=== International ===
Scores and results list Canada's goal tally first.

#	Date	Venue	Opponent	Score	Result	Competition
1	27 April 1999	Windsor Park, Belfast, Northern Ireland	Northern Ireland	1–0	1–1	Friendly match

=== Managerial ===
As of 23 November 2021.

Managerial record by team and tenure
Team	From	To	Record							
Team	From	To	G	W	D	L	GF	GA	GD	Win %
(England) Queens Park Rangers (caretaker manager, with Steve Gallen)	9 December 2009	17 December 2009	1	0	1	0	2	2	+0	0.00
(Republic of Ireland) Waterford	12 May 2021	23 November 2021	29	13	6	10	42	40	+2	44.83
Total			30	13	7	10	44	42	+2	43.33

== Honours ==
Millwall

- Football League Second Division: 2000–01

Canada

- CONCACAF Gold Cup: 2000
