= Frederick Layton =

English-American businessman (1827–1919)

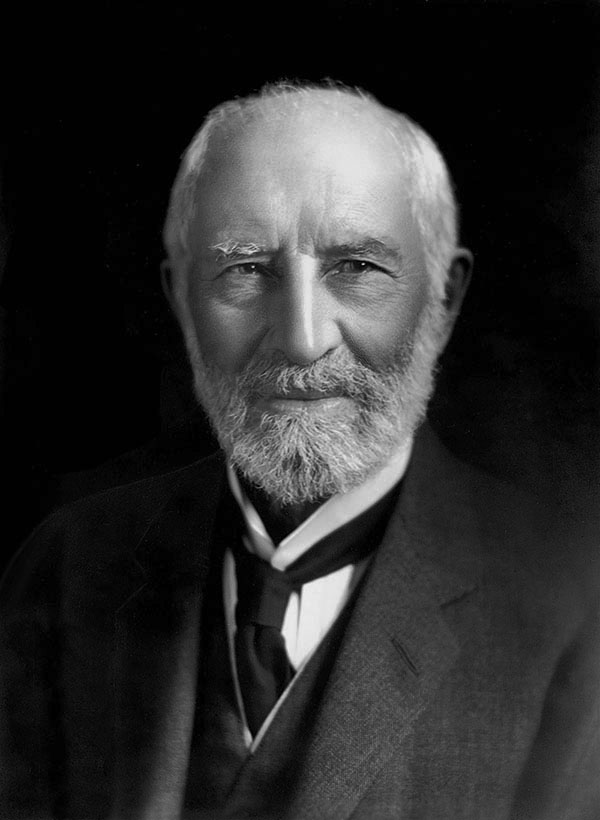
- Born: May 18, 1827; Little Wilbraham, England
- Died: 16 August 1919 (aged 92); Milwaukee, Wisconsin
- Occupations: Philanthropist, businessman, art collector
- Spouse: Elizabeth Ann Hayman

Frederick Layton (May 18, 1827 – August 16, 1919) was an English-American businessman, philanthropist and art collector. He immigrated to Milwaukee, Wisconsin Territory, with his father in 1843, when the city was still a pioneer village. He played a major role in the creation of Milwaukee's meat packing industry and established a trans-Atlantic business exporting his meat products to Great Britain. During his lifetime, he made 99 trips across the Atlantic pursuing business interests and collecting fine art in London and the other capitals of Europe. Throughout his life, he consistently donated his money to support local charities and Milwaukee's art community.

In 1888, he commissioned the Layton Art Gallery on the corner of Mason and Jefferson streets in Milwaukee, one of the nation's earliest public art galleries. Layton was personally able to purchase over 200 works of art for the institution before dying at the age of 92. Though the original building of the Layton Art Gallery no longer exists, many of Layton's purchases found their way into the collection of early European and American art of the Milwaukee Art Museum.

== Early life ==
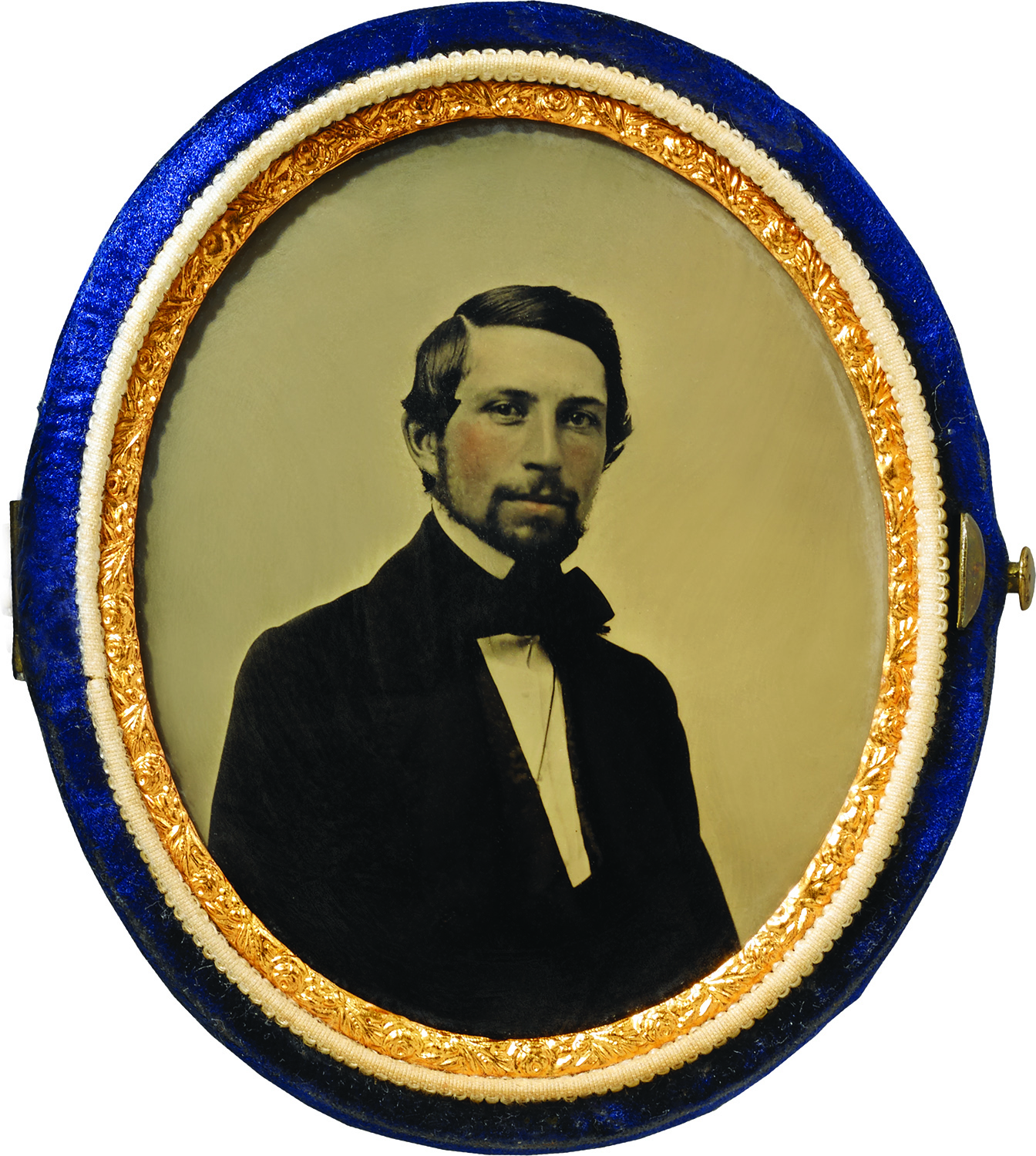
Earliest known photograph of Frederick Layton, c. 1850

Layton was born in Little Wilbraham, a village in Cambridgeshire, England, the only son of Mary and John Layton. The family moved to Great Wilbraham in 1836, where Frederick's father established a small country butcher shop and taught his son the trade.

In 1842, father and son immigrated to the United States. They spent the winter in Buffalo, New York, before arriving in Wisconsin in 1843. Mary Layton rejoined the family and immigrated to Milwaukee in 1847.

== Business ==
Father and son established their first home in Wisconsin as farmers in the town of Raymond in Racine County, Wisconsin. After two years, they returned to the butcher trade and opened the J&F Layton Meat Market in Milwaukee on East Water Street in 1845.

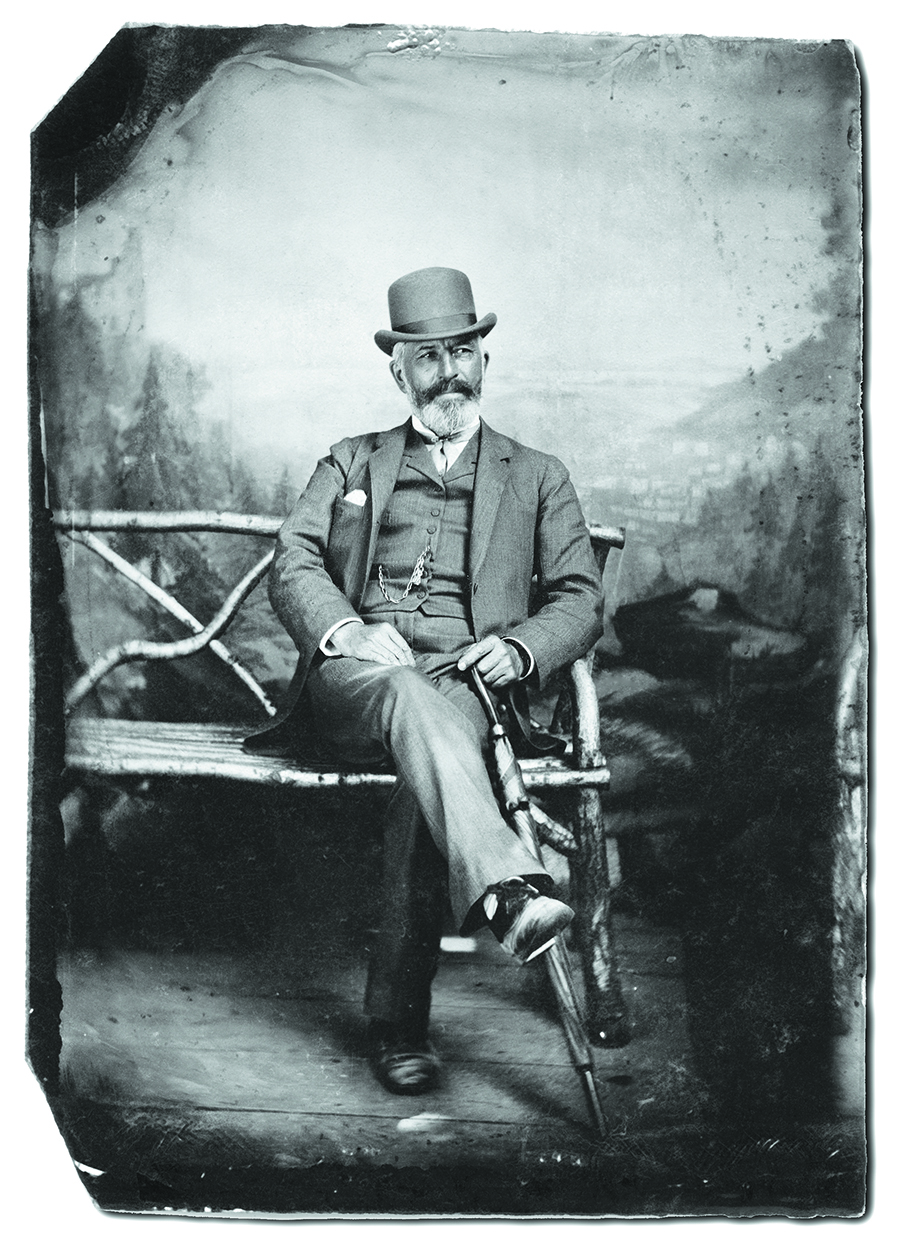
Frederick Layton, c. 1880s

In 1849, John and Frederick purchased farmland near what is now Forest Home Cemetery and built a three-story brick building, constructed for the purpose of a home as well as a hotel for paying guests traveling the Janesville–Milwaukee Plank Road. The Layton Hotel was a popular choice for farmers transporting wheat: "the roads were in such frightful condition that farmers and other travelers welcomed the opportunity to stay overnight, waiting for daylight to continue their journey."

In 1852, Frederick joined John Plankinton to form a partnership for the packing of pork and beef under the name of Layton & Plankinton. With a loan of $3,000 (equivalent to $88,783 in 2024) from Samuel Marshall and Charles Ilsley of Marshall and Ilsley Bank, the two built a slaughter and packinghouse in the Menominee Valley of Milwaukee.

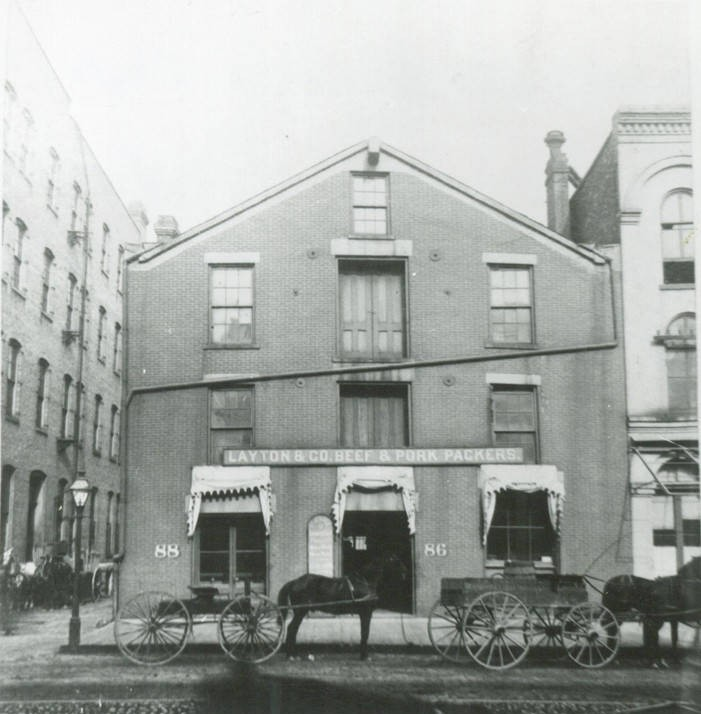
The Layton & Co. Store on Water St, Milwaukee, in 1888

As business grew, Layton began traveling abroad and created a network of provision wholesalers in Liverpool and London. With the aid of wholesalers Samuel Page and John Hargreaves, Layton products became widely known in England.

Though the Layton & Plankinton business was successful, the two parted ways to form their own firms. In 1861, Frederick and John Layton established their packing plant in the Menominee Valley under the style of Layton & Co.

In 1865, Frederick Layton, Samuel Marshall, Charles F. Ilsley, John Plankinton, and W. S. Johnson incorporated the Milwaukee Railway Company, absorbing the River and Lake Shore City Railway Company. With the increasing advancements of the railroad industry, Layton & Co. found new and improved ways to efficiently receive and deliver both their livestock and meat products.

John Layton remained head of the plant until his death in 1875, whereupon Frederick took over until his retirement in 1900 at the age of 73. The company continued long after Layton's retirement, until 1935, when it liquidated its assets.

In 1999, Frederick Layton was inducted to the Wisconsin Meat Industry Hall of Fame.

There are two Milwaukee streets named after Frederick Layton. Layton Avenue was designated by Patrick Cudahy in 1892 when he named the streets of the city of Cudahy. Layton Boulevard, which runs through the Menomonee Valley where the Layton & Co. packing plant once stood, was named through an ordinance adopted by the city of Milwaukee in 1909.

== Private life ==
In 1851, Layton married Elizabeth Ann Hayman. The daughter of Joel and Mary Hayman, Elizabeth and her family immigrated to Oak Creek, Wisconsin, from Devonshire, England, in 1836. The wedding was officiated by the Reverend Doctor David Keene of St. John's Episcopal Church. Keene was also an English immigrant who collected engravings, etchings and fine rare books. With a common background and interest in art, Keene and the Laytons became lifelong friends.

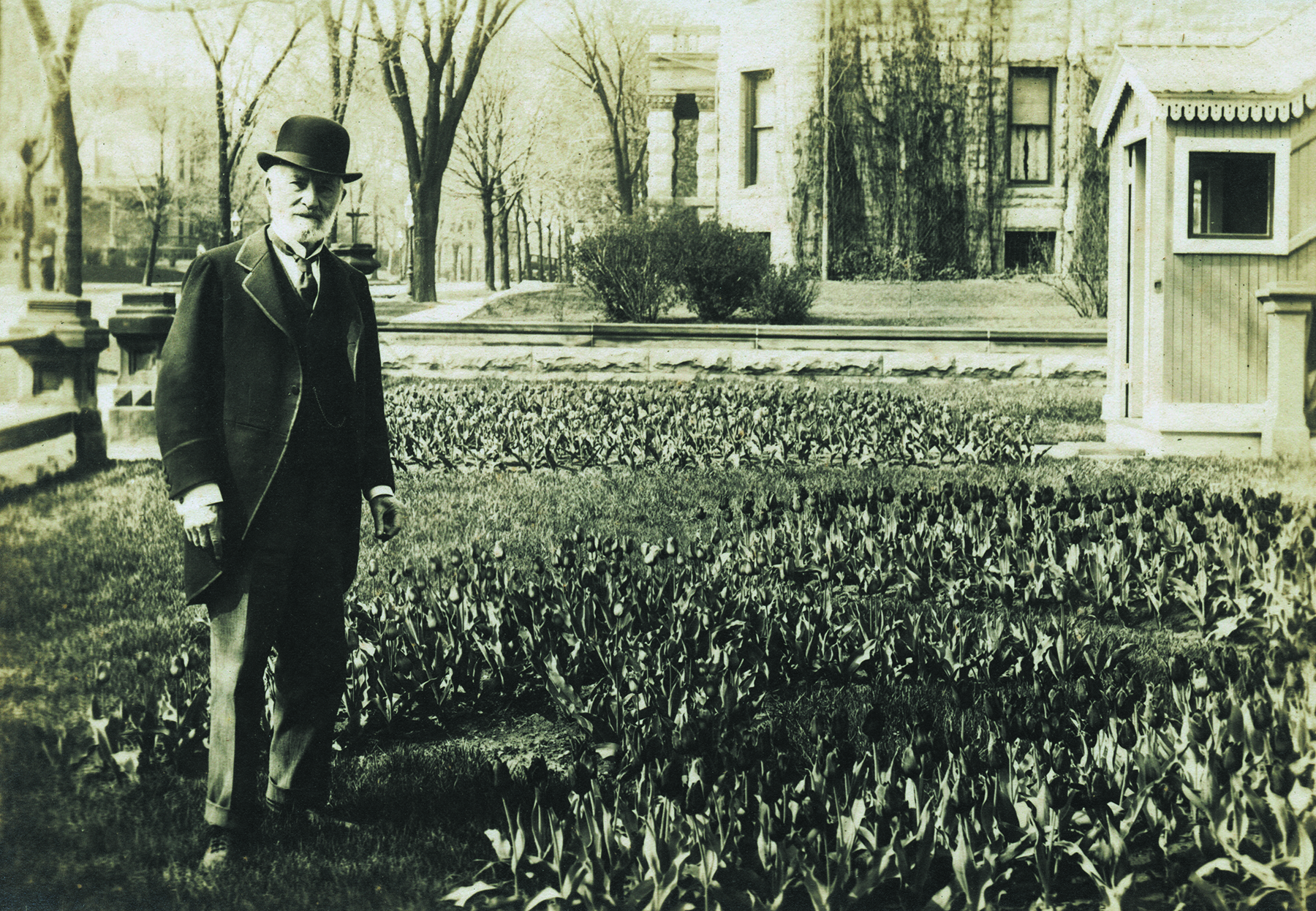
Frederick Layton in garden in front of his Marshall Street residence in Milwaukee

In 1865, Frederick and Elizabeth settled in a clapboard house located at 524 Marshall Street, Milwaukee. Although Layton's business was successful and while his contemporaries were moving into larger, more luxurious residences, Layton and his wife maintained their home to the end of their days. It was recorded that inside the house were plain, old-fashioned furniture and homemade rag rugs laid on painted wood floors. Frances Stover wrote: "Mr. Layton enjoyed visiting the fine homes of his friends; he praised their taste, he admired architectural niceties. But for himself, the small square house was sufficient." Frederick and Elizabeth had no children. Elizabeth died on June 3, 1910.

Layton and his wife kept their life private as much as possible. When one reporter kept prying, Layton responded: "I have done nothing to cause people to want to know of my private life. Mrs. Layton and I have given when we could in a way that we hoped would be a source of occasional pleasure or benefit to others, but we have had our return in the pleasure of giving and there's no need of talking of it."

== Art collecting ==
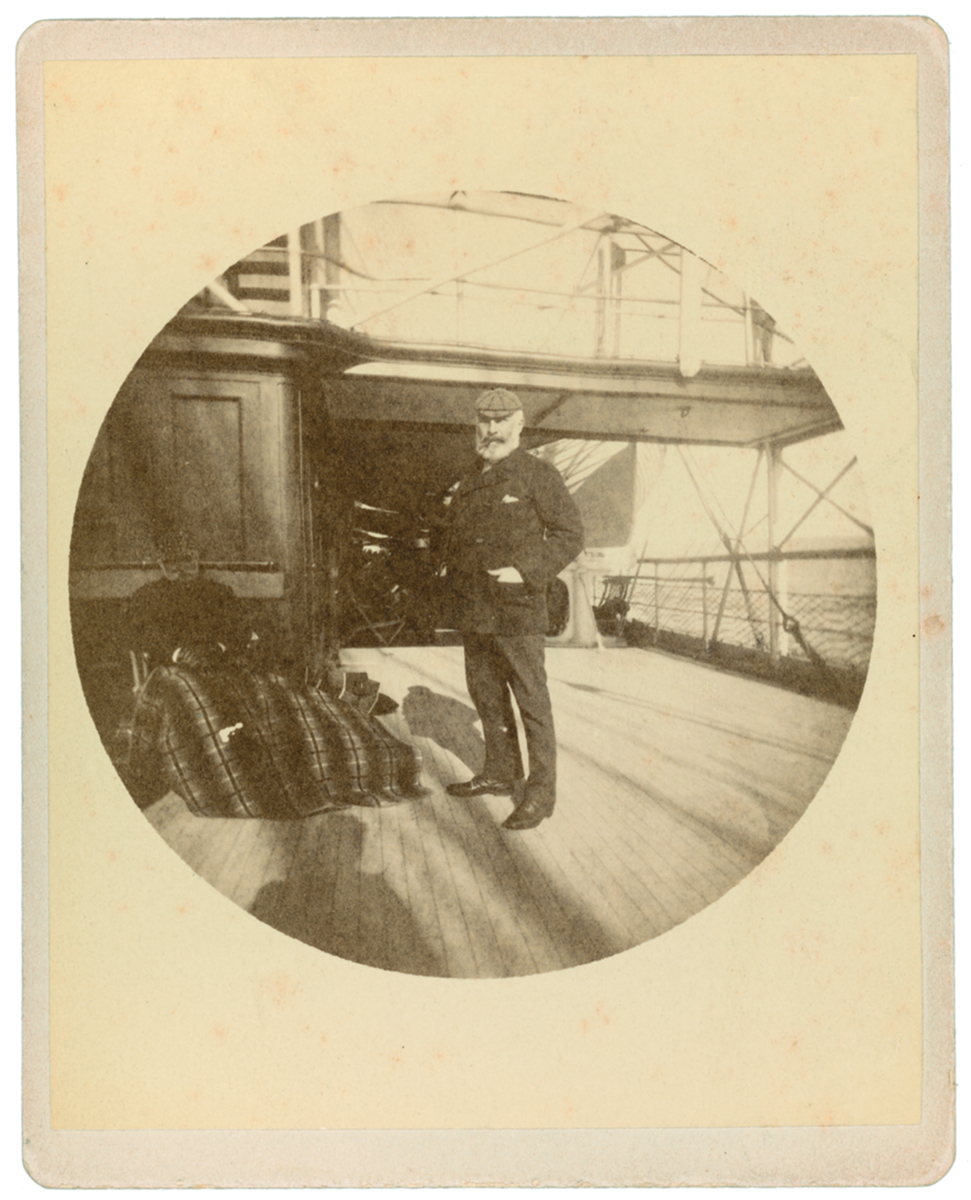
Frederick Layton on the deck of ship in 1891

In 1883, Layton commented that something must be done to build an art gallery for the city of Milwaukee. Word spread and the Milwaukee Sentinel reported that Layton was going abroad to advance that purpose by examining other museums and purchasing art. The episode launched Layton's collecting activities. He utilized his business trips to secure works, making purchases in Britain, France, Italy, Switzerland, and the Netherlands In 1888, Layton gifted part of his collection to the new Layton Art Gallery he had commissioned in downtown Milwaukee. As part of the gift, he stipulated that the gallery be open at least three days a week without charge for admission and that the facility be available to art students at least two days a week to copy paintings.

Layton made other contributions to Milwaukee's growing art community by lending works of art to local exhibitions, as well as providing prize money to other arts organizations that awarded local artists for their entries in special exhibitions. Additionally, Layton helped formally organize the Milwaukee Art Association and was elected its first vice president in 1910.

In April 1919, Layton received an award from the National Society of American Scientists as one of the first promoters of art in the United States. In 2004, he was posthumously awarded the Wisconsin Visual Art Lifetime Achievement Award.

== Other philanthropy ==
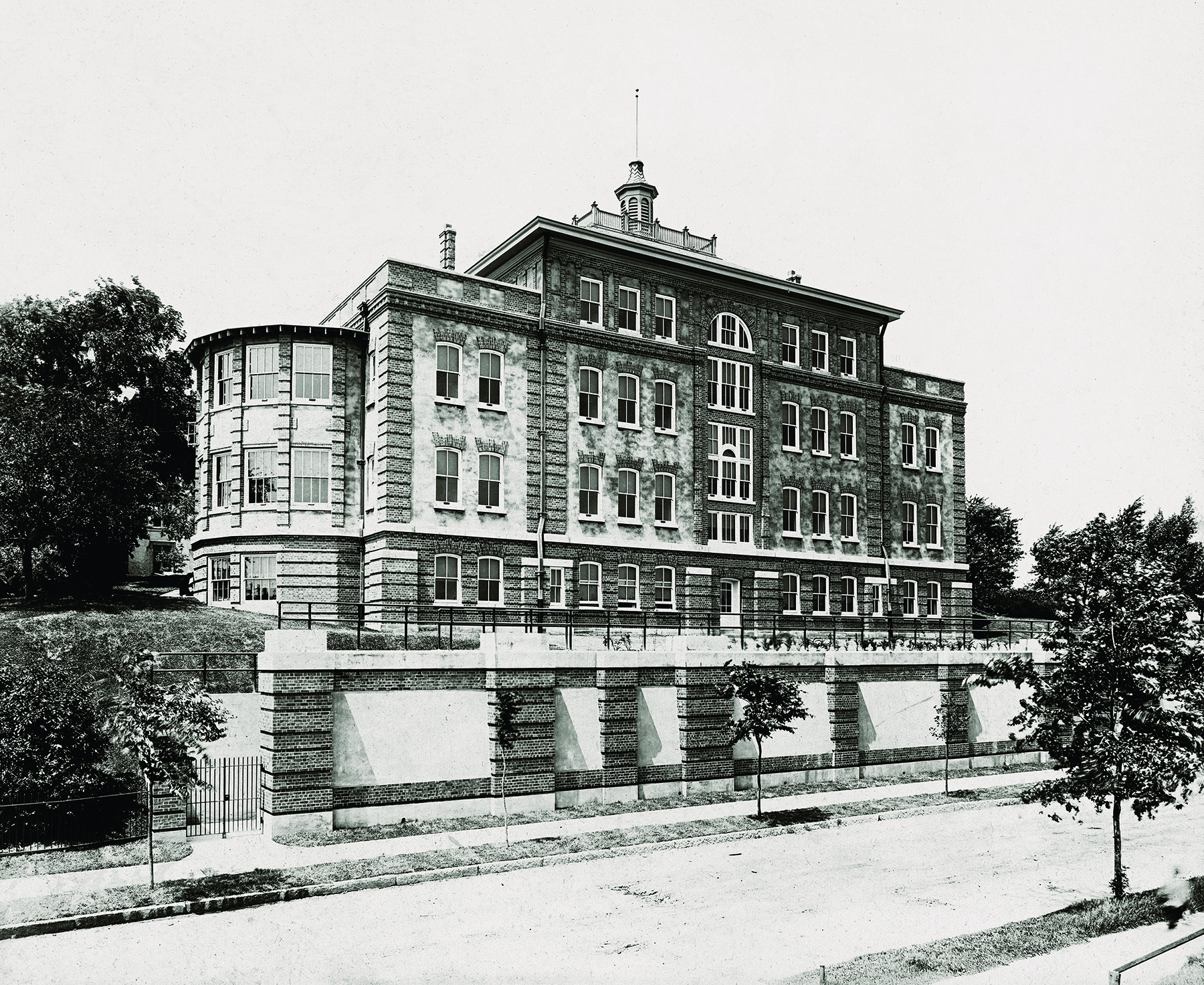
The Layton Home for Incurables was built in Milwaukee and endowed by Elizabeth and Frederick Layton.

In 1908, Mr. and Mrs. Layton donated to the Milwaukee Hospital a home for chronic diseases, the Layton Home for Incurables. The Laytons provided the funding for the equipment, furniture, and construction of the building. In years prior, the Laytons had also donated approximately $20,000 (equivalent to $491,115 in 2024) to the Milwaukee Hospital for landscaping and improvement of the hospital grounds.

In 1901, Layton revisited his birthplace of Little Wilbraham and erected three cottages for elderly villagers who could not afford their own residence. The cottages were built and endowed in memory of his mother, Mary Layton.

Layton was awarded the Liberty Service Medal in May 1919 by the National Institute of Social Service in recognition of the founding of the Layton Art Gallery, Layton Home for Incurables and the Mary Layton Cottages in Little Wilbraham.

Layton also made other smaller donations to local charities on a frequent basis and was therefore given the unofficial titles of "Milwaukee's First Citizen" and Milwaukee's "Grand Old Man" by the local press.
