= Robert Bolgar =

Anglo-Hungarian Classicist (1913–1985)

Robert Ralph Bolger
- Photographed by Antony Barrington Brown in 1954
- Born: Caius Coriolanus Robert Ralph Bolgar; 2 June 1913; London
- Died: 23 June 1985 (aged 72); Great Wilbraham, Cambridgeshire, England
- Occupation: Classical scholar
- Spouse: Elizabeth (m. 1943)

Academic background
- Education: Cardinal Vaughan Memorial School, London; King's College, Cambridge

Academic work
- Institutions: Durham University; King's College, Cambridge
- Notable works: The Classical Heritage and its Beneficiaries (1954)
- Military career
- Allegiance: United Kingdom
- Branch: British Army
- Service years: 1939–1946
- Units: Suffolk Regiment; Army Educational Corps
- Wars: Second World War

Caius Coriolanus Robert Ralph Bolgar (2 June 1913 – 23 June 1985), sometimes spelt Bolgár, was an English classical scholar of Hungarian origins, a Fellow of King's College, Cambridge. Known as Robert, he published most of his work as R. R. Bolgar.

Bolgar gained an international reputation with his book The Classical Heritage and its Beneficiaries (1954), his contributions to the Cambridge Bibliography of English Literature, and in editing the proceedings of symposia on "Classical Influences on European Culture".

== Early life ==
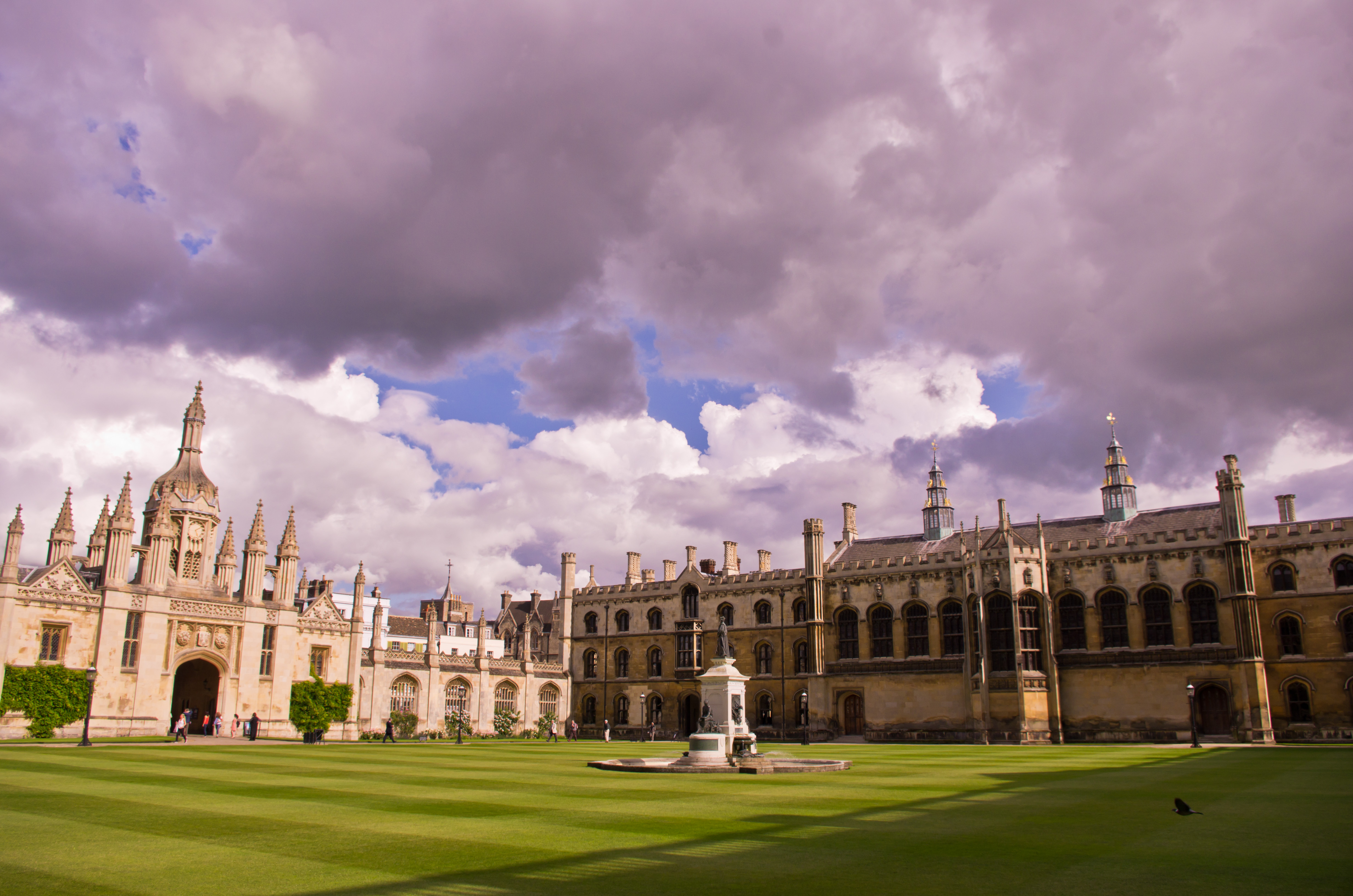
King's College, Cambridge, where Bolgar spent most of his life

Caius Coriolanus Robert Ralph Bolgar was born in London in June 1913, the son of Ernest Joseph Bolgar, who had begun life as Ernst Johann von Brokl, and his wife Erna Edith Szibenliszt. His father was an Austro-Hungarian of Sudeten-German origin who spoke both Hungarian and German. He had changed his name after being cheated out of an inheritance, and Bolgar said in later life that but for this misfortune of his father's, instead of becoming a Cambridge don, he might well have been a landowner in Moravia who supported the Nazis and been liquidated by the Russians in 1945.

At the time of his birth, Bolgar's father had a job at the Austro-Hungarian consulate in London, but at the age of one year Bolgar was taken to live in Hungary, later in Germany and France, where until the age of eleven he had his early education.

In 1925, his father returned to London, and Bolgar was sent to the Cardinal Vaughan Memorial School in Holland Park. From there, he won a classical scholarship to King's College, Cambridge, entering the college in 1932.

In 1939, Bolgar graduated as a Ph.D, and was awarded a Fellowship at King's.

== Second World War ==
When the Second World War began in September 1939, Bolgar's father was Second Secretary at the Hungarian Legation in London, and the Kingdom of Hungary was one of the Axis powers. He was allowed to stay in England to look after the legation building, but was nevertheless an enemy alien. Bolgar's parents were then living at 94, Philbeach Gardens, in Earl's Court.

Bolgar, born in England, applied to join the British Army, but due to the status of his father he could not be commissioned. He was able to join the Suffolk Regiment as an enlisted man, and after two years was transferred to the Army Educational Corps. For eighteen months he was posted to Ranchi in the Bihar Province of British India, in command of an educational centre which suffered from many sudden transfers of its instructors. He returned to civilian life in 1946.

== The Classical Heritage and its Beneficiaries ==
After returning from India, Bolgar spent eight years as a research fellow at King's, developing the work for his thesis into a book, The Classical Heritage and its Beneficiaries, which was finally published in 1954. This deals with a process lasting a thousand years and includes sections on classical studies in Ireland and Britain 450–600, the Anglo-Saxon schools 650–800, the educational reforms of Charlemagne, a chapter on Byzantine culture, and appendices which list the translations from Greek and Roman classical authors before 1600 and the Greek manuscripts in Italy during the fifteenth century. It was published by Cambridge University Press in a volume of 599 pages.

Douglas Bush called The Classical Heritage and its Beneficiaries a "massive book" and John Guillory "an encyclopedic account of the transmission of classical literature from late antiquity through the end of the Renaissance". Bolgar notes in it that his aim was "to show the impact of the dominant ideologies of each period upon general education". The book brought him to the attention of scholars in the United States when re-published in New York in both hardback and paperback editions.

== Academic career ==
From 1954 to 1956, Bolgar was a research fellow in education at Durham University. He then returned to King's as a fellow and college lecturer in Modern Languages, in 1958 becoming the college's Director of Studies and Supervisor in French. He was also appointed as a governor of Impington Village College and the Bottisham Village College.

At the time of the Hungarian Revolution of 1956, King's and Trinity agreed to take in twenty-five Hungarian student refugees, and Robert Rattenbury, the Registrary of the university, gave Bolgar the task of escorting them from London and helping them to settle in. Bolgar invited them to his own house, where they met his mother and were astonished at the survival of a refined form of Hungarian society dating from the early years of the 20th century.

Bolgar gained a greater international reputation by his contributions to the Cambridge Bibliography of English Literature, and by editing the proceedings of three international conferences on "Classical Influences on European Culture" which he organized with Patrick Wilkinson. The first, in 1969, covered the period from 500 to 1500; the second, in 1974, that from 1500 to 1700; the third, in 1977, that from 1650 to 1870.

Bolgar's lectures, sponsored by three faculties – Classics, Modern Languages, and English –, were stimulating and entertaining, but as they cut across the faculties they were mostly supported until 1973 by King's College; the university then created an ad hominem Readership for him.

== Personal life ==
In the summer of 1943, at Norwich, Bolgar married Elizabeth Rowley or Adcock, with whom he had two daughters and a son. They lived in the villages of Girton and Great Wilbraham, both near Cambridge, where Bolgar developed an interest in local history as a recreation.

Bolgar's father died in Cheam, Surrey, in March 1953, leaving a modest estate to his widow, Erna Edith Bolgar. She then went to live with her son in Cambridge and died there in 1971, aged 81.

Bolgar died at Great Wilbraham in June 1985, leaving an estate valued at £34,691. An obituary in The Times reported that his students forgave him for his chronic forgetfulness and lack of punctuality.

== Selected publications ==
- R. R. Bolgar, "Rabelais's edition of the Aphorisms of Hippocrates" in Modern Language Review Vol. 35, No. 1 (January 1940), pp. 62-66
- R. R. Bolgar (1954). The Classical Heritage and its Beneficiaries: from the Carolingian Age to the End of the Renaissance. Cambridge University Press – via Internet Archive.
- R. R. Bolgar, ed., Classical Influences on European Culture, A.D. 500-1500: Proceedings of an international conference held at King’s College, Cambridge, April 1969 (Cambridge University Press, 1971, ISBN 9780521118132)
- R. R. Bolgar, ed., Classical Influences on European Culture, A.D. 1500–1700: Proceedings of an International Conference Held at King's College, Cambridge, April 1974 (Cambridge University Press, 1976)
- R. R. Bolgar, ed. (1979). Classical Influences on Western Thought, A.D. 1650–1870: proceedings of an international conference held at King's College, Cambridge, March 1977. Cambridge University Press – via Internet Archive.
- R. R. Bolgar, "The Near-Christian" in Theology, Vol. 70, Issue 565 (July 1967), pp. 299–302
- R. R. Bolgar, "Humanist education and its contribution to the Renaissance" in The Changing Curriculum (Routledge, 1971, ISBN 9780203707135)
