= P. J. Honey =

Irish-born Vietnamese language scholar and historian

Patrick James Honey (16 December 1922 – 17 August 2005) was an Irish-born Vietnamese language scholar and historian.

== Biography ==
=== Early life and education ===
Honey was born in Navan, County Meath, Ireland. He went to Cardinal Vaughan Memorial School in London before entering Birkbeck, University of London in 1940 to read Classics. In 1941 he enlisted in the Royal Navy, seeing active service on the Atlantic convoys, on the Russian convoys, in the Italian campaign, and finally the Far East. In 1945, when the Japanese surrendered in Saigon, the young lieutenant was sent with a small British force under General Douglas Gracey to maintain civil order in Saigon. This was Honey's first encounter with Vietnamese culture. Also in 1945, he married Frances Watson (who died in 1986) and had one son and two daughters with her. In 1946, after being demobilised, he resumed his studies in London, and graduated in Classics from University College London in 1949.

=== Career ===
In 1949, Honey was recruited to take up the Vietnamese language, which was considered very difficult, requiring a special aptitude from classics graduates to master. Honey was persuaded by the 1947 Scarbrough Report, which drew attention both to the importance that increasing contacts between countries would assume after the Second World War and to the serious lack of expertise across Oriental and African languages that the war had revealed. He was trained under J. R. Firth. From 1949 to 1965 he served as the first Lecturer in Annamese at the School of Oriental and African Studies, University of London.

After 16 months of preliminary training, he was sent to Vietnam for his first year of long study. In 1951 Honey arrived at Saigon, when the guerrilla war led by the Vietminh against the French was increased. With a lot of difficulties and at considerable risk, Honey was able to make it to Hanoi to conduct his research and study the local language. This period was very valuable, since in 1954, the Geneva Agreements partitioned the country into two-halves, and North Vietnam was not accessible for a long time.

During this time, Honey also earned a BA degree in Chinese. He became a valuable source of knowledge about Southeast Asia and its cultures, languages, and politics. Many students from Australia and from the United States came to study with him. The British Foreign Office sought his advice about Vietnam.

Also seeking his wisdom was the US Government. On 26 September 1963, in Saigon, Vietnam, at the invitation of the 5th US Ambassador to the State of Vietnam, Henry Cabot Lodge Jr., P.J. Honey briefed the 8th US Secretary of Defense, Robert S. McNamara. Introduced to McNamara by Lodge as Professor Smith from an American University, P.J. Honey's influence upon McNamara can be seen throughout McNamara's report on his encounter with Honey; an aide to McNamara – William P. Bundy – later reported that he thought that "Smith's" testimony had carried "considerable weight with McNamara" (See footnote 2).

Here is a condensed version of what McNamara wrote after his briefing by P.J. Honey:

"2. (Ngo Dinh) Diem has aged terribly since 1960. He is slow mentally. ... 4. (Ngo Dinh) Diem would not last 24 hours without (Ngo Dinh) Nhu who handles the bribes and manipulates the power base necessary for his survival. ...

8. ... Only a military coup or an assassination will be effective and one or the other is likely to occur soon. In such circumstances we have a 50% chance of getting something better. ...

14. The American government cannot do anything other than to either publicly support (Ngo Dinh) Diem or keep our mouths shut. If we follow the latter policy, a coup will probably take place within four weeks." By the end of the sixth week after this report was written, both Ngo Dinh Diem and Ngo Dinh Nhu are dead.

In 1964 Cornell University invited P.J. Honey as a visiting professor. In 1965 Honey was promoted to Reader in Vietnamese Studies in the University of London, a post he held until 1985. After 1975, when Saigon fell, as the boat people flooded the outside world, his language skills were called upon to brief both officials and refugees from Vietnam. From 1982 to 1985 he was head of the Department of South-East Asia, after which he retired and moved to Devon.

In 1991 he remarried, wedding Isabelle Boyer.

== Published works ==
From the 1950s Honey wrote many articles about Vietnamese language, history, and politics. His major research interest was the communist regime in North Vietnam. A representative of his articles on this subject was:

- Honey, P.J. (1969), The National United Front in Vietnam: A Communist Strategy for Revolution, Studies in Comparative Communism, Vol. 2, No. 1 (January 1969), pp. 69-95. JSTOR

in which he wrote:

❝ In certain respects, the successful completion of their revolution by Vietnamese communists in North Vietnam was a greater achievement than that of the Russians, the Yugoslavs, the Chinese, the Cubans, or any other successful communist revolutionaries.❞ — Honey, P.J. (1969), The National United Front in Vietnam: A Communist Strategy for Revolution

His books included:

- Introduction to Hoàng Văn Chí's From Colonialism to Communism. 1962
- Communism in North Vietnam: Its Role in the Sino-Soviet Dispute. Hardcover, Greenwood Press, 1963. ISBN 0-8371-6791-4 (0-8371-6791-4)
- Genesis of a Tragedy: The Historical Background to the Vietnam War. Hardcover, Benn, 1968. ISBN 0-510-27305-X (0-510-27305-X)
- Voyage to Tonking in the Year At-Hoi : P. J. B. Truong-Vinh-Ky. Softcover, 1982. ISBN 0-7286-0099-4 (0-7286-0099-4)
