= Great Wilbraham =

Village in Cambridgeshire, England

Coordinates: 52°11′39″N 0°15′57″E

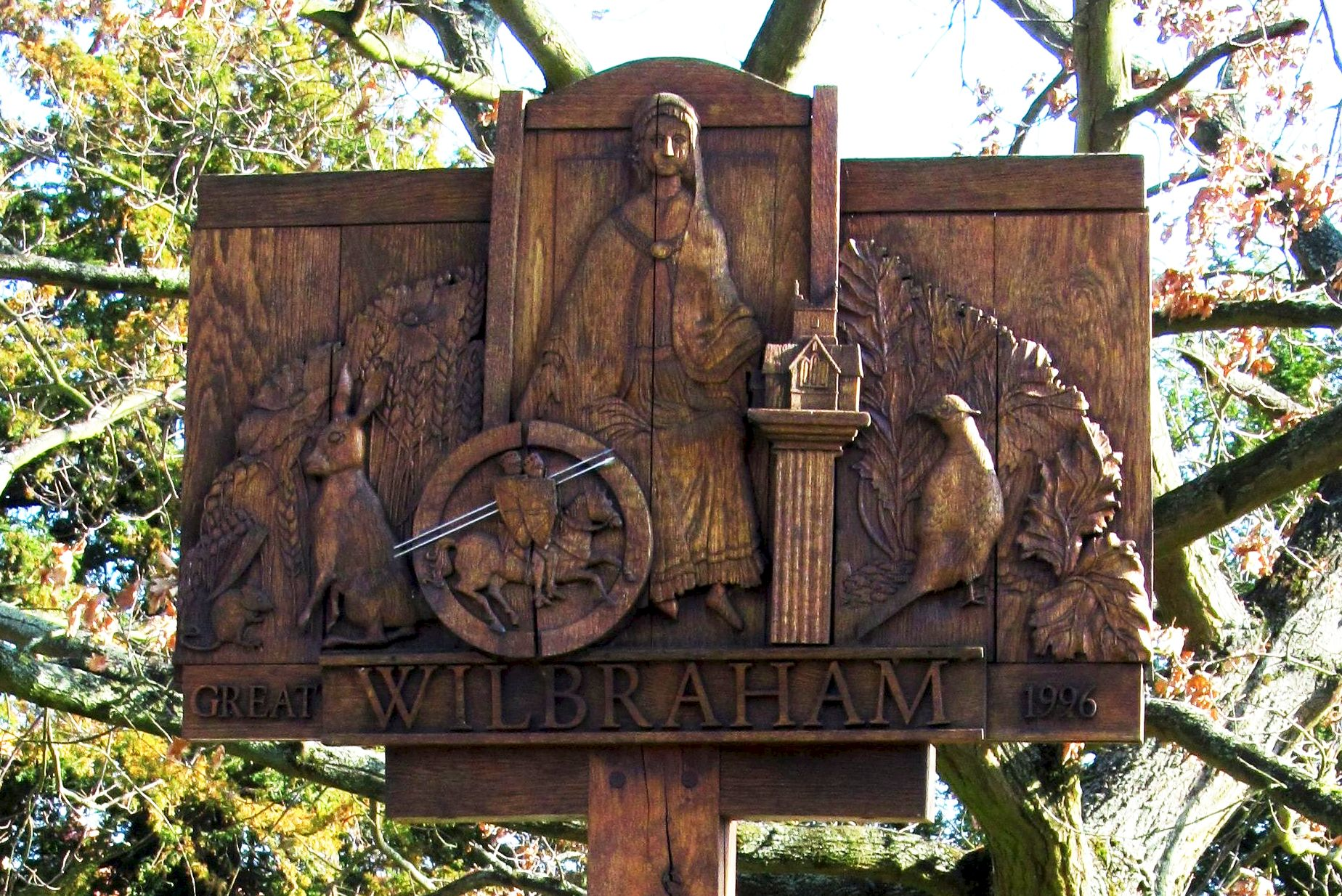
- Carved wooden village sign

- Location within Cambridgeshire
- Population: 606 (2021 census)
- OS grid reference: TL549577
- Shire county: Cambridgeshire
- Region: East
- Country: England
- Sovereign state: United Kingdom
- Post town: Cambridge
- Postcode district: CB21
- Dialling code: 01223
- UK Parliament: South Cambridgeshire

Great Wilbraham is a small village situated in a rural area some seven miles (11 km) to the east of Cambridge, between the edge of an area of low-lying drained fens to the west and north, and higher ground beyond the A11 to the east.

The administrative authorities are Cambridgeshire County Council, South Cambridgeshire District Council, and Great Wilbraham Parish Council.

== History ==
The parish of Great Wilbraham has been occupied for thousands of years; a Neolithic camp, Great Wilbraham causewayed enclosure, was excavated in the west of the parish in 1976, and a Bronze Age barrow, where up to eight burials were discovered in 1852, lies alongside the Fleam Dyke in the southern corner of the parish. A possible Roman dwelling was also located in woodlands.

The medieval history of Great Wilbraham is tied up with that of neighbouring Little Wilbraham, and they were first distinguished in the 13th century when it was also known as King's Wilbraham. Listed as Wilburgeham in the 10th century, and Wiborgham in the wapentake of Staine in the Domesday Book of 1086, the name "Wilbraham" means "Homestead of a woman called Wilburh".

== Demographics ==
Census population of Great Wilbraham parish
Census	Population	Female	Male	Households	Source
1801	354				
1811	396				
1821	495				
1831	510				
1841	564				
1851	644				
1861	596				
1871	604				
1881	547				
1891	523				
1901	456				
1911	467				
1921	444				
1931	460				
1951	435				
1961	448				
1971	432				
1981	614				
1991	598				
2001	639	327	312	264	
2011	654	324	330	277	
2021	606	311	295	269	

== Church ==
A church was built in Wilbraham in around 970 by a monk from Ramsey Abbey. The present church, dedicated to Saint Nicholas, dates from the 12th century, and the font and the nave's north wall survive from that period. Extended over the following 200 years, the west tower dates from around 1400. A short spire was added but had gone by the late 18th century.

The village has been home to nonconformity since the 17th century, and there has been a strong Baptist presence since then. A Baptist chapel survives at the north end of Angle End.

== Village life ==
Great Wilbraham is mostly residential in nature. Employment within the village is mostly agricultural but there are also a number of small businesses. Many of the working residents commute into Cambridge or other nearby towns such as Newmarket.

The village has a variety of house types, mostly Victorian or older, with post-war infill development, and a small number of modest-scale modern estates. No significant expansion is anticipated in the near future. A number of attractive period houses surround the large village green, which adjoins the churchyard. There is a Post Office/general store and a village hall/social club.

Great Wilbraham retains one pub, the Carpenter's Arms, which has been open since at least 1767. Former pubs were The (Sedan) Chair, recorded from 1765, and the 19th century King's Head and White Swan, both of which closed in the late 1960s.

The voluntarily aided church primary school enjoys an excellent reputation with approximately 100 pupils between the ages of 5 and 11. Within the village there are two pre-school groups, one attached to the school. Children of secondary age mostly attend the Village College in the nearby village of Bottisham.

There is a strong sporting tradition within the village, with cricket and football teams making use of the green. Darts and indoor bowls are also played in the social club. Money is raised by an annual sports day which includes many stalls and events such as coconut shies, pony rides, running races and even cake competitions.

== Notable people ==
- Robert Bolgar (1913–1985), Cambridge don
- Edward Bond (1934–2024), playwright

== See also ==
- Great Wilbraham Preceptory
- Wilbraham, Massachusetts
