= Steve Gallen =

Irish football coach (born 1973)

Personal information
- Full name: Stephen Gallen
- Date of birth: 21 November 1973 (age 52)
- Place of birth: Acton, London, England

Team information
- Current team: Millwall (Director of Football)

Youth career
- 1990–1994: Queens Park Rangers

Senior career*
Years	Team	Apps	(Gls)
1994–1996	Doncaster Rovers		

International career
1991–1992	Republic of Ireland U18	2	(0)
1993–1994	Republic of Ireland U21	4	(0)

Managerial career
- 2009: Queens Park Rangers (caretaker manager)
- 2016: Pegasus
- * Club domestic league appearances and goals

Stephen Gallen (born 21 November 1973) is a London-born Irish football coach who is the Director of Football at Millwall Football Club.

== Coaching and managerial career ==
=== Queens Park Rangers ===
Gallen was employed for almost two decades at Queens Park Rangers, and first joined the Academy coaching setup in 1997, as the under-12s coach. In December 2009, he and fellow academy coach Marc Bircham jointly assumed managerial duties for a match against West Bromwich Albion, after manager Jim Magilton was suspended; the game finished 2–2. He was in the position of Senior Professional Development Coach, coach of the QPR U21 side, from 2014 to 2015, when he was promoted to First Team Coach. He left the club on 30 January 2016.

Gallen has two brothers, Joe and Kevin, both of whom played for QPR before also joining the coaching staff.

=== Pegasus ===
On 23 June 2016, Pegasus announced that Gallen would be the club's manager from the 2016–17 Hong Kong Premier League. He left the club on 3 November 2016 after struggling to adapt to Hong Kong culture.

=== Charlton Athletic ===
On 19 April 2017, Gallen joined Charlton Athletic as the club's Head of Recruitment. Steve was appointed as Director of Football on 10 January 2020 soon after Charlton Athletic was taken over by East Street Investments. Gallen departed Charlton on 2 August 2023.

=== Montserrat ===
On 9 September 2023, he took over as assistant manager of the Montserrat national football team under Lee Bowyer.

=== Millwall ===
On 10 May 2024, Gallen was announced as the new Director of Football at Millwall.

== Managerial statistics ==
Team	Nat	From	To	Record				
Team	Nat	From	To	G	W	L	D	Win %
Queens Park Rangers (caretaker manager, with Marc Bircham)	(England)	16 December 2009	17 December 2009	1	0	0	1	0%
Pegasus	(Hong Kong)	23 June 2016	3 November 2016	6	2	2	2	33.33%
Total				7	2	2	3	28.57%

== Honours ==
=== As manager ===
Queens Park Rangers under-18s

- Football League Youth Alliance Cup winner: 2009–10
- Football League Youth Alliance South East Conference champion: 2010–11, 2011–12
- Professional Development under-18 League Two champion: 2012–13
- Esad Osmanovski Memorial Cup runner-up: 2013
- Newark International Soccer Classic winner: 2013

Queens Park Rangers under-21s

- Professional Development under-21 League Two runner-up: 2013–14

== As Director of Football ==
- League One Play off winners: 2019
