= Little Wilbraham =

Village in Cambridgeshire, England

Coordinates: 52.205°N 0.263°E

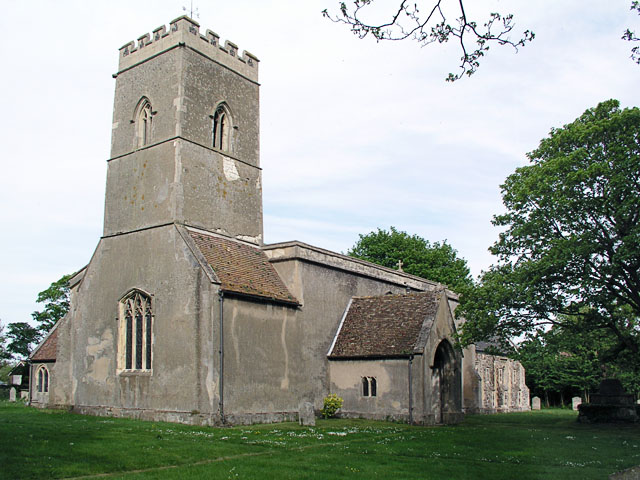
- St John the Evangelist

- Location within Cambridgeshire
- Population: 425 (2011 Census)
- OS grid reference: TL546587
- Shire county: Cambridgeshire
- Region: East
- Country: England
- Sovereign state: United Kingdom
- Post town: CAMBRIDGE
- Postcode district: CB21
- Dialling code: 01223

Little Wilbraham is a village in Cambridgeshire, England, 6 miles (10 km) east of Cambridge between the A1303 and the A11. It is in the district of South Cambridgeshire. It is a small village with a population of only 394, increasing to 425 at the 2011 census, and there is little employment within the village. The church of Saint John the Evangelist lies to the east of the village.

== History ==
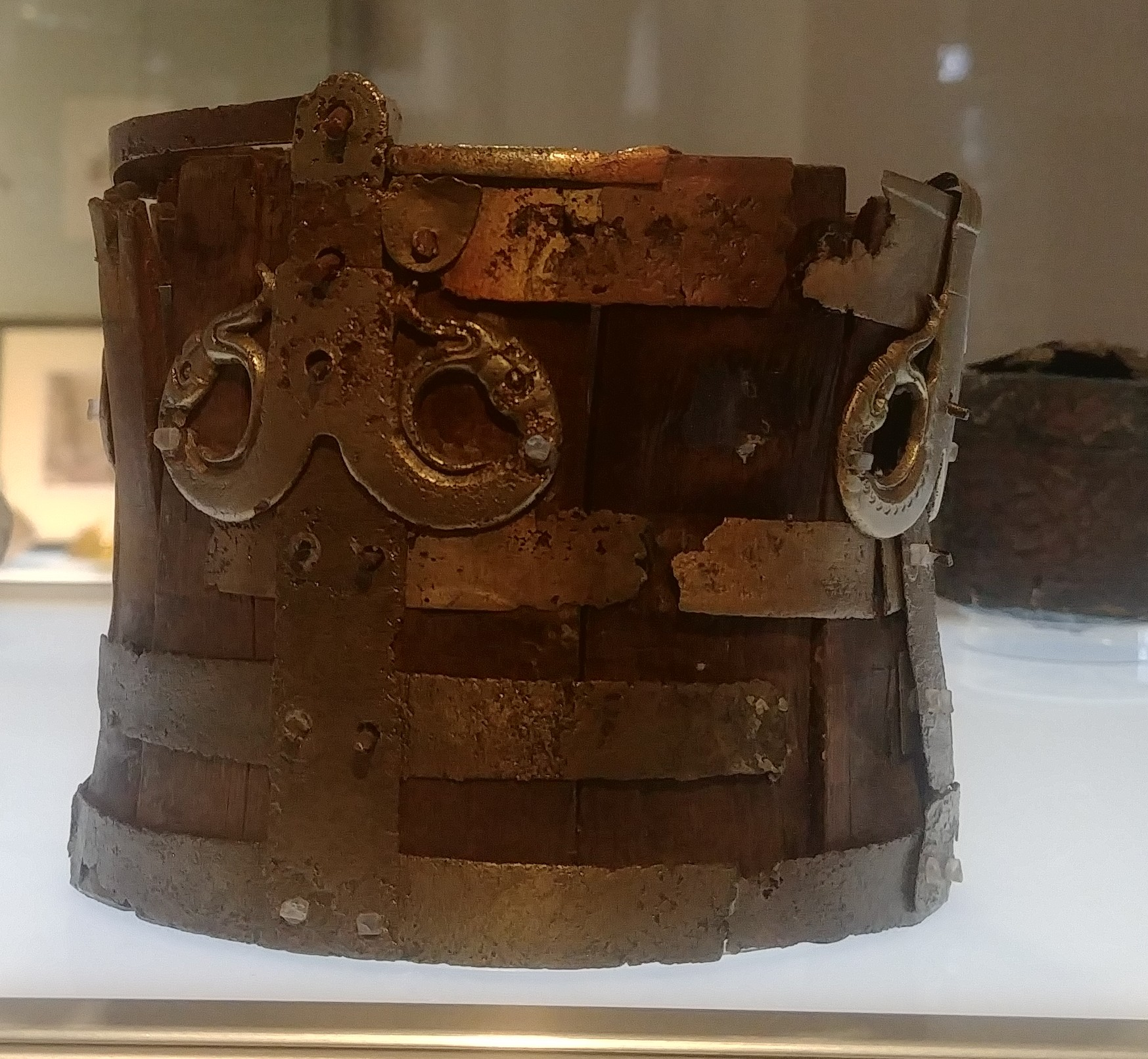
Early medieval bucket from Little Wilbraham, Cambridgeshire. Wooden bucket with copper-alloy fittings.

Little Wilbraham was an independent village by 1086, known as Little Wilbraham by the 13th century - however also known as 'Little Wilborham' during the early 17th century. In the mid-nineteenth century burials were excavated in the village, dating to the early medieval period, recovering 188 inhumations and 125 cremations, with notable finds including an iron-bound bucket and a horse burial. No ancient woodland was recorded in 1086, but 13 peasants were. The number of landholders increased to c. 40 by 1279. In 1563 there were only 21 families. Under Charles II, there were c. 40 dwellings and 124 adults. By the 1750s, this stood at 41 families with 183 adults. The total population rose steadily to reach 392 in 1851 and then 412 in 1881 before falling gradually to 266 in 1951. It now stands at 394.

Nowadays, a few small farmhouses and cottages survive from the 17th and early 18th century including White Hall, as timber-framed building from around 1600. Since 1800, there has been a divide in habitation in the village. To the east, on a street called Green Street by 1460, lay the rectory and the church whilst to the west, as section called Hawk Street, most of the farmhouses and cottages existed. The Gate, originally the main village public house, recorded from 1783, closed after 1937. The Hole in the Wall, however, was still open until recently in a three-bayed, mid-16th-century building, enlarged westward in the 18th century.

== St. John the Evangelist ==
The main body of St. John's Church in Little Wilbraham dates from the mid 13th century. The first known rector of the church was Walter, son of William, who lived around 1230. Late in the 13th century, the north aisle was added, probably originally as a chapel. On the outside, set into the flint wall, are the remains of the lower half of a crusader cross and this, along with the memory of the Order of the Templars, demonstrates the close links between the village and one of the Military Orders of the Crusading period. The 14th century saw major changes to the church. Early in the 14th century, the square tower was added at the west end, strengthened by supporting abutments or flying arches. On the north side, the wall was reconstructed so the top half of the crusader cross was lost. New windows were built in. Nearing the end of the 14th century, five ornate windows were also added.

In the 15th century, the south side of the chancel was reconstructed and the oak door leading into the church was added. The octagonal font to be found in the church is a remarkably well preserved example of perpendicular stone-work. The church at this time would have looked very similar to how it looks today. The tomb on the left side of the altar commemorates Revd. Erasmus Lane, rector who died on 27 October 1715, aged 75. In the chancel are two further tombs, one commemorating William Blackwey (died 11 April 1521) and the other for Rev. John Hook, fellow of Bene't College, who died on 12 August 1777.

== Services ==
The nearest hospital is Addenbrooke's in Cambridge; the Doctors surgeries are in Bottisham 2 miles (3 km) away and Fulbourn. The majority of children attend the Church Controlled Primary School in Great Wilbraham, which was built in 1996 and has approximately 100 on roll. They then move on to Bottisham Village College. A Playgroup meets in a mobile classroom in the school grounds. There are no shops in the village and the nearest Post Office is in Great Wilbraham, there is however a small pub and a post box. There is no projected housing for the village as it is infill only. Many villagers also play in the local cricket and football teams based in the nearby village of Great Wilbraham.

== See also ==
- Great Wilbraham
- Great Wilbraham Preceptory
- Wilbraham, Massachusetts
