= Joe Gallen =

English footballer (born 1972)

Personal information
- Full name: Joseph Gallen
- Date of birth: 2 September 1972 (age 54)
- Place of birth: Hammersmith, England
- Position: Striker

Senior career*
Years	Team	Apps	(Gls)
1991–1993	Watford	0	(0)
1992–1993	Exeter City	6	(0)
1992–1993	→ Shamrock Rovers (loan)	3	(0)
1993–1995	Shrewsbury Town	6	(1)
1995–1997	Dundalk	48	(18)
1997	Aylesbury United	3	(1)
1997	Stevenage Borough	4	(0)
1997–1998	Drogheda United	17	(4)
Total		87	(24)

International career
1992–1993	Republic of Ireland U21	7	(0)

Managerial career
- 1998–2004: Queens Park Rangers (youth team coach)
- 2004–2007: Queens Park Rangers (head of youth development)
- 2007: Exeter City (assistant manager)
- 2007–2013: Millwall (assistant manager)
- 2013–2016: Wolverhampton Wanderers (assistant manager)
- 2016: Rotherham United (assistant manager)
- 2017–2021: Portsmouth (assistant manager)
- 2021: Portsmouth (caretaker manager)
- 2021–2022: Leyton Orient (assistant manager)
- 2022–2023: Perth Glory (assistant coach)
- 2023–: Crystal Palace (1st team scout)
- * Club domestic league appearances and goals

Joseph Gallen (born 2 September 1972), is a former professional footballer who is assistant coach of Perth Glory. Born in England, he made seven appearances for the Republic of Ireland U21 national team. His brothers Kevin and Steve were both professional footballers.

== Playing career ==
Joe Gallen played for Watford, Exeter City, Shamrock Rovers, Shrewsbury Town, Dundalk Stevenage Borough and Drogheda United. He also represented the Republic of Ireland national under-21 football team, before his career was cut short with a back injury at the age of 26.

=== Watford 1989-1993 ===
Gallen was part of Watford's FA Youth Cup-winning squad of 1989, starting in the 2nd leg of the semi final against Brentford.

==== Exeter City (loan) ====
In December 1993 Gallen joined Alan Ball's Exeter city on loan from Watford.

=== Shrewsbury Town 1993-1995 ===
Gallen signed a 2 year contract with Shrewsbury Town in 1993 and was part of the squad which won promotion and crowned champions of Division 4 (League 2).

=== Dundalk 1995-1997 ===
Gallen signed a 2 year contract with League of Ireland side Dundalk in 1995. In both seasons Gallen was the clubs top scorer.

=== Stevenage Borough 1997 ===
Gallen signed a short-term contract with Stevenage Borough making a number of substitute appearances.

=== Drogheda United 1997-1998 ===
In October 1997 Gallen signed for League of Ireland side Drogheda United before leaving in the summer of 1998.

== Coaching and management career ==
=== Queens Park Rangers 1998-2007 ===
After the end of his playing career, Gallen took up coaching and started working as QPR's under-9s coach. After working his way upwards through the relevant age groups, he was named U17's coach in 2002. In 2003 he was named as U18s coach and in 2004 named as head of youth development. During this time he recruited, signed and developed an 11 year old Raheem Sterling, signing him on a 5 year contract the only time he gave that length of deal out. In 2007 the club sold Dean Parrett to Tottenham Hotspur for a fee of over £1 Million after Gallen had re-signed the player to a contract extension the year before. Notable other players that were signed by Gallen include Darnell Furlong, Jacob and Josh Murphy, Pat Kanyuka and Ray Jones. Ray Jones was signed by Gallen in 2005 and became a 1st team regular during the 2006-07 season.

In 2004 Gallen signed Kiyan Prince to the U14 team. In May 2006 Prince was murdered outside his school trying to stop the bullying of another pupil. Gallen spoke at Princes' funeral.

Gallen acquired his UEFA A Coaching licence by the age of 28, his UEFA Pro Licence in 2012 and studied at South Bank University in a master's degree course The Science of Sports Coaching.

=== Exeter City 2007 ===
Gallen worked alongside Paul Tisdale and Steve Perryman at the start of the 2007 season. That season Exeter City were promoted back into the Football League. Gallen left Exeter city in November 2007.

=== Millwall 2007-2013 ===
Gallen was appointed assistant manager to Kenny Jackett in November 2007, with the club in the bottom 4 of League 1. In the 2008-09 season Millwall finished in 5th place, beating Leeds Utd over 2 legs in the play offs before reaching the final. Millwall were denied promotion back to the Championship after losing to Scunthorpe Utd 3-2 at Wembley.

The following season 2009-10 Millwall finished 3rd in League 1, beat Huddersfield Town in the play offs before winning promotion after beating Swindon Town 1-0 in the play off final at Wembley.

Millwall finished 9th in their first season back in the Championship during the 2010-11 season. In 2013 Millwall reached the FA Cup Semi Finals losing 2-0 to eventual winners Wigan Athletic at Wembley Stadium.

Gallen worked on the training ground with a 19 year old Harry Kane after Kane had signed on loan from Tottenham Hotspur in the second half of the 2012-13 season. Other notable players that were developed by Gallen include Chris Wood, Andros Townsend, Adam Smith and Steve Morison.

=== Woverhampton Wanderers 2013-2016 ===
Gallen joined Kenny Jackett again as assistant head coach at the start of the 2013-14 season. Wolverhampton Wanderers achieved promotion at the first time of asking, winning the league with a record points total of 103. The following season back in the Championship the club achieved 7th position missing out on the play offs by goal difference. In Summer 2016 Gallen was relieved of his duties alongside Jackett after new owners Fosun had acquired the club.

=== Rotherham United 2016 ===
Gallen joined Rotherham United in October 2016, resigning in November 2016.

=== Portsmouth 2017-2021 ===
Gallen again joined manager Jackett at Portsmouth in June 2017. In 3 full seasons the team finished 8th, 4th, 5th in League 1. The club was knocked out in the play offs by Sunderland in 2018-19 season and on penalties by Oxford Utd in the 2019-20 season. The team reached the final of the JPT Trophy in consecutive season, beating Sunderland on penalties at Wembley in 2019 and losing on penalties to Salford in an empty Wembley Stadium (due to Covid restrictions) in 2021.

Gallen was named as caretaker manager in March 2021.

=== Leyton Orient 2021-2022 ===
Gallen was named as assistant head coach in June 2021, and was relieved of his duties in February 2022.

=== Perth Glory 2022-2023 ===
Gallen was named as assistant head coach of A league side Perth Glory in Western Australia. Gallen left for personal reasons in February 2023.

=== Crystal Palace 2023 ===
Gallen joined Premier League side Crystal Palace as 1st team scout in July 2023.
