= Morgridge =

Morgridge is a surname. Notable people with the surname include:

- Carrie Morgridge (born 1967), American philanthropist and author, daughter-in-law of John
- John Morgridge (born 1933), American businessman, former CEO of Cisco Systems
