= German-English Academy Building =

Historic place in Milwaukee, Wisconsin, United States

Coordinates: 43.0441°N 87.9081°W

- German-English Academy
- U.S. National Register of Historic Places
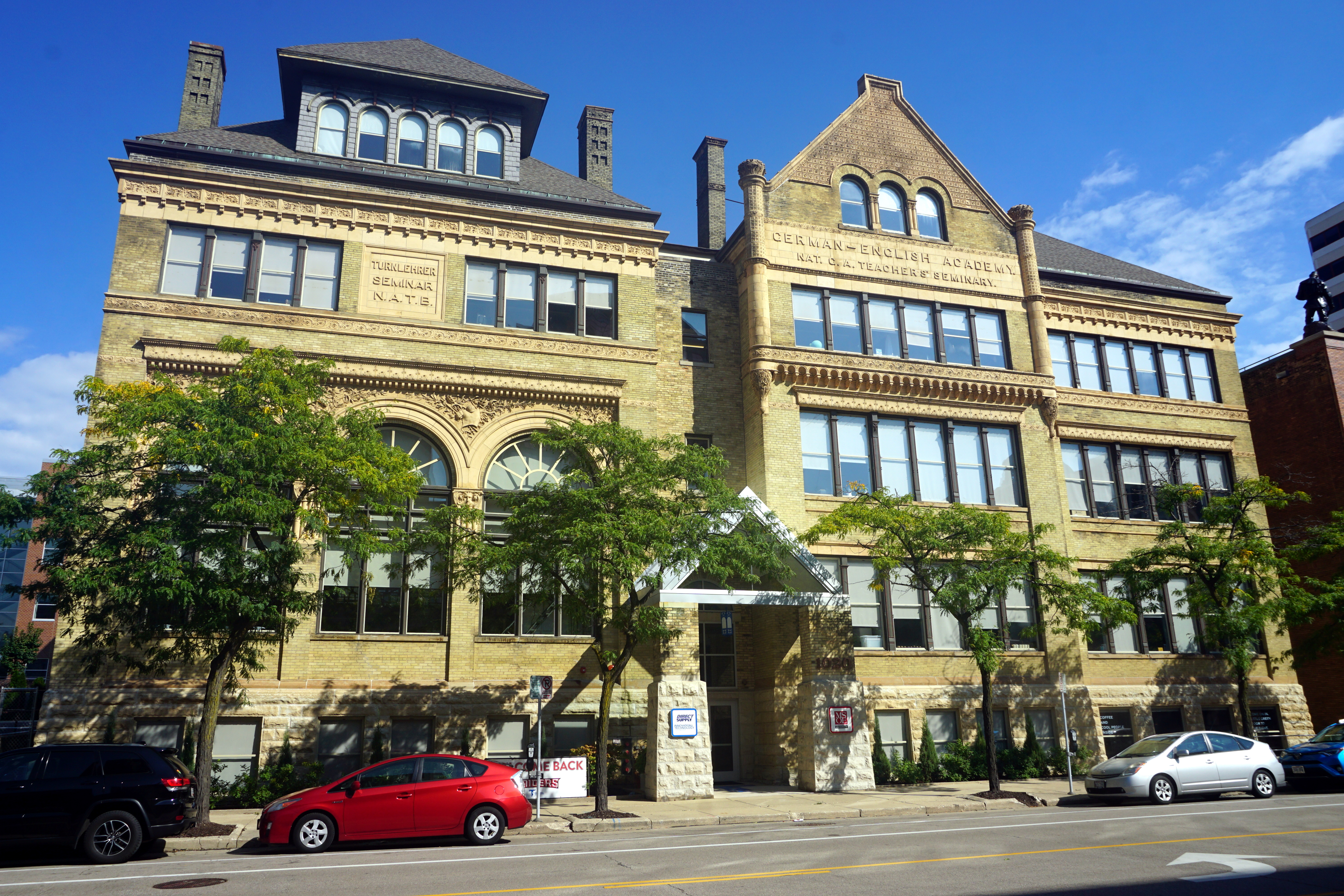
- German-English Academy Building
- Location: 1020 N. Broadway; Milwaukee, Wisconsin
- Built: 1891, 1892
- Architect: Crane and Barkhausen
- Architectural style: Romanesque Revival
- NRHP reference No.: 77000037
- Added to NRHP: April 11, 1977

The German-English Academy Building is a school built in Milwaukee, Wisconsin in 1891 for the German-English Academy (founded in 1851), which later became the University School of Milwaukee. The building is listed on the National Register of Historic Places and is now owned by the Milwaukee School of Engineering. Since 2012, it has been leased to the company Direct Supply as a technology center. It is beside the Grohmann Museum.

== Architecture ==
The 3½-story building was designed by Charles D. Crane and Carl C. Barkhausen, the latter was himself an alumnus of the German-English Academy. Barkhausen was later trained in architecture in Germany.

The structure consists of two wings, with the entrance in the linking section between them. The south wing – now by the Grohmann Museum – housed the academy's classrooms. To the right of the entrance is the south wing's attached neo-Gothic pavilion (slightly protruding block), which is topped by a prominent gable end with three arched windows. The north wing, now next to the parking lot, contained the gymnasiums.

Each wing is covered by a steep hip roof. The north wing has a wide five-windowed dormer that is, in turn, covered by a hip roof, which emerges from the slope of the main roof. The back of the building also has a similar wide dormer, but completely in gray. The north side of the building has a large gable-fronted dormer.

== History ==
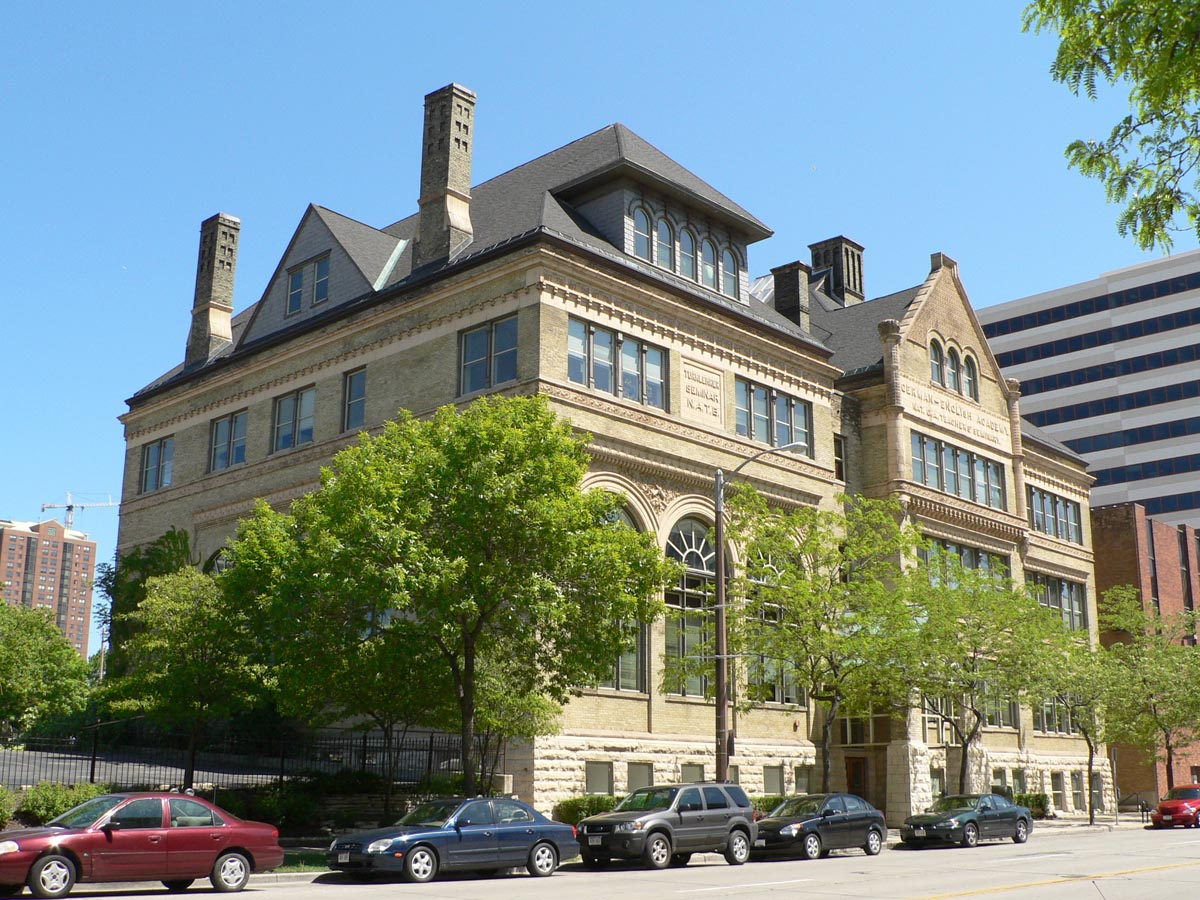
German-English Academy in 2006

In 1851, some of Milwaukee's wealthy German immigrants formed the Milwaukee Schulverein (School Association). Many of the founders were Forty-Eighters, progressives who had left Germany after the German revolutions of 1848–49 failed. Unhappy with Milwaukee's public schools, and wanting instruction in German as well as English, they started a private school called the German-English Academy (die deutsch-englische Akademie). Aside from teaching German, the Academy brought in other ideas from German education at the time: singing, drawing and domestic science classes; physical education based on the German Turner movement. In 1873, the Academy offered the first kindergarten in Milwaukee. Classes initially met in the home of Peter Engelmann, the first teacher, but soon outgrew that.

In 1891-1892, a new home (pictured) was built for the school, with two blocks. The Pfister/Vogel family financed the southern classroom block (on right in photo). It is 3.5 stories, in Romanesque Revival style, with a limestone foundation, cream-brick walls, bands of windows, small towers on the corners, small arcades, and a hip roof. The Milwaukee Turner Society funded the northern gymnasium block (on left) which is similar, but with arcades of large windows to let light into the gymnasium, and with towering chimneys. Designs on the gymnasium's terra cotta spandrels depict Indian clubs, foils, and other Turner athletic equipment. Both blocks were designed by Charles D. Crane and Carl C. Barkhausen (a former student of the Academy), achieving a unified design.

The new building allowed study of manual arts for boys, domestic science for girls, and phy-ed for both. It housed a natural science museum and labs for physics and chemistry. The Academy produced many teachers for Milwaukee's public school system and "in 1900, the Superintendent of Schools credited 'Engelmann's School' with being the model for the public school system."

During WWI, amidst suspicion of all things German, the German-English Academy changed its name to the Milwaukee University School. In 1927, that school moved to River Hills. The building was converted in 1930 to a furniture store, with extensive changes to the interior. In 1933, the Milwaukee School of Engineering acquired it and resumed using it for education. In 1982, the facade was restored and the interior remodeled as offices.
