= John Morgridge =

American businessman (born 1933)

- Born: John Philip Morgridge; July 23, 1933 (age 93)
- Education: University of Wisconsin–Madison (BA); Stanford Graduate School of Business (MBA)
- Known for: CEO of Cisco Systems (1988–1995)
- Spouse: Tashia Frankfurth
- Children: 3
- Relatives: Carrie Morgridge (daughter-in-law)

John P. Morgridge (born 1933) is an American businessman who was the CEO and chairman of the board of Cisco Systems.

== Early life and education ==
Morgridge was born to L. D. Morgridge and Ruth Gordon Morgridge, who were both teachers and church members. He has one brother, Dean L. Morgridge, and one sister, Barbara Morgridge. He grew up in Wauwatosa, Wisconsin, where he attended Wauwatosa East High School. He worked part-time at jobs such as washing equipment in a sweet pea cannery, digging stone at the quarry in Lannon, washing walls in Milwaukee's Pabst Brewery, doing road construction on Highway 64, and working as a railroad brakeman. In 1955, he graduated from the University of Wisconsin–Madison and in 1957, he earned an MBA from Stanford Graduate School of Business.

== Career ==
After school, he worked for Stratus Computer and Honeywell Information Systems before being president and chief operating officer of GRiD Systems. He joined Cisco in 1988, then a four-year-old company with 34 employees, as its second chief executive officer and chairman of the board. He was replaced by John Chambers as CEO in 1995 and as chairman in 2006. At his retirement in 2006, Cisco had 50,000 employees in 77 countries.

== Philanthropy ==
In 1996, the University Center for Community Service at the University of Wisconsin–Madison was renamed the Morgridge Center for Public Service in recognition of a generous endowment to expand its scope.

In 2006, the Morgridges supported the founding of a public-private partnership between the Morgridge Institute for Research and the Wisconsin Institute for Discovery with a $50 million donation.

In 2010, Morgridge and his wife donated $175 million to create the Fund for Wisconsin Scholars, an endowment which will provide grants to low-income students attending one of Wisconsin's public colleges or universities. Morgridge Family Foundation donated funds to Immanuel Lutheran School, Mount Olive Lutheran Church, and to several educational and volunteering organizations.

Looking back on his life, says John Morgridge, in addition to parents, church and school, "it's the community that helps form our moral compass. It's those attitudes that I've remembered through my entire lifetime. We've been very blessed with what this country has given us. And we intend, before we die, to give it back."

Morgridge is on several corporate and charity boards of directors, including the Nature Conservancy, the Wisconsin Alumni Research Foundation, and was a trustee of Stanford University (2002–2007) where he teaches management at the Graduate School of Business. Morgridge and his wife are among the group of American billionaires who have committed to give the majority of their wealth to the philanthropic causes and/or charities as part of The Giving Pledge.

Morgridge and his wife donated $140 million towards the construction of the University of Wisconsin's School of Computer, Data and Information Sciences, which was subsequently named in his honor (Morgridge Hall) and opened in 2025.

== Personal life ==
Morgridge married his high school sweetheart, Tashia Frankfurth (a special education teacher), great-granddaughter of William Frankfurth, the co-founder of the German-English Academy, which is now known as the University School of Milwaukee. They have an adult son and daughter, and a second son who died of leukemia.

Morgridge was featured in the documentary film Something Ventured, which premiered in 2011.

== Honors and recognition ==
- 1991, Wisconsin Distinguished Business Alumnus Award
- 1996, Stanford Graduate School of Business Arbuckle Award
- 2005, Distinguished Alumni Award from the Wisconsin Alumni Association
- 2007, Golden Plate Award of the American Academy of Achievement
- 2012, Regents’ Award for Distinguished Service to the University of Wisconsin System
- 2015, James C. Morgan Global Humanitarian Award
- 2017, TECH CORPS Leadership in Technology Award
