= William Frankfurth =

William Frankfurth (1829–1891) was a German American businessman and founder of the German-English Academy (today University School of Milwaukee).

== Biography ==
Frankfurth was born in Gudensberg, Hesse, Germany. He joined the Freie Gemeinde or "Free Thinkers" movement that arose in Germany and after the failed revolution of 1848, he immigrated to the United States in 1850, settling in Milwaukee. His first job was with the John Pritzlaff Hardware Company. In 1861, he founded his own hardware firm, the Frankfurth Hardware Company which also manufactured tin items (such as tubs, pails, and kettles). In 1875, the company expanded into the wholesale business and by 1885, exited the retail side of the business, becoming one of the largest hardware wholesalers in the Midwest distributing to over 1,200 retail stores in Wisconsin, Michigan, and Illinois. Frankfurth was an incorporator of the Milwaukee Turnverein Association, a German-American gymnastic club; a founder, along with Peter Engelmann, of the German-English Academy (now known as the University School of Milwaukee); and a member of the first public library board. He was married to Magdalena Frankfurth and had four children. He died in 1891, while traveling in Vienna, Austria. He was a collector of ancient European artifacts and his family donated his collection to the Milwaukee Public Museum.
