= Arthur J. Baroody =

Educational psychologist (born 1947)

Arthur J Baroody
- Born: August 15, 1947 (age 79)
- Occupations: Educational psychologist, academic, mathematics education researcher

Academic background
- Education: Cornell University

Academic work
- Institutions: University of Illinois at Urbana-Champaign; University of Denver

Arthur "Art" J. Baroody (born August 15, 1947) is an educational psychologist, academic, and an expert in mathematics education research. He is a Professor Emeritus of Curriculum and Instruction at the University of Illinois at Urbana-Champaign, and a Senior Research Fellow in Morgridge College of Education (COE) at the University of Denver.

== Education ==
Baroody attended Cornell University and earned a B.S. in science education in 1969 and a Ph.D. in educational and developmental psychology in 1979. For the latter degree, he was mentored by Herbert P. Ginsburg.

== Career ==
Baroody began his academic career as an Assistant Professor of Developmental Psychology at Keuka College in 1978. He joined the University of Rochester’s Graduate School of Education and Human Development in 1980 as a Research Associate for H. P. Ginsburg’s NIE Research Grant: "Cognitive Development Approach to Mathematics Learning Difficulties". From 1983 till 1986, he served as the Principal Investigator for a NIH Research Grant: "Basic Mathematics Learning in TMR and EMR Children." His next appointment was at the University of Illinois Urbana-Champaign as an Assistant Professor of Elementary and Early Childhood Education (1986–1989). He was promoted to Associate Professor of Curriculum and Instruction in 1989, and to Professor of Curriculum and Instruction in 1994. During this time, he also held a concurrent appointment with the Bureau of Educational Research from 1987 to 1990, and then again from 1999 to 2001. He retired in 2009 and was made an emeritus professor of Curriculum and Instruction. Since 2013, he has also been serving as Senior Research Fellow of Morgridge College of Education at the University of Denver.

Since 2000, Baroody has been the Principal Investigator or Co-PI on 12 grants from the National Science Foundation, Institute of Education Sciences, Spencer Foundation, National Institutes of Health, and National Governors’ Association.

== Research ==
Baroody’s early research focused on the development of informal mathematical knowledge of children in early childhood and those with learning difficulties. He discovered a previously unrecognized counting-based mental-addition strategy, namely Felicia’s strategy of counting-all from the larger addend (solving, e.g., 2 + 5 by counting “1, 2, 3, 4, 5; 6 [is one more], 7 [is two more]). Subsequent research confirmed that Felicia’s strategy is the primary transition between more basic informal addition strategies and the advanced strategy of counting-on from the larger addend—sometimes called the MIN strategy because counting is minimized by counting on a number of times equal to the smaller added.

Baroody contributed to a balanced view of children’s informal mathematical knowledge by exploring both its strengths and limitations. He found that children’s informal view of addition as making a collection larger is a barrier to their recognizing the commutative property of the operation—that the order in which two addends are added does not matter. His studies also indicated that an understanding of additive commutativity is not necessary for inventing strategies that disregard addend order (i.e., Felicia’s and the MIN strategies).

Baroody challenged the conventional wisdom in psychology at the time by arguing that children may use relational knowledge to learn and represent the basic arithmetic facts. He overheard a kindergartner comment: Six and one more "is an easy one, because it’s just the number after six." That is, the child realized she could use her existing knowledge of the counting sequence to determine add-1 sums—that adding one to a number such as six resulted in a sum equal to the next number in the count sequence: seven (the number-after rule for adding one). In addition to serving as a basis for fluency with add-1 sums and doubles-plus-1 reasoning strategy, the number-after rule appears to serve as basis for inventing counting-on from the larger (MIN). The key educational implication is that instruction should focus on meaningful memorization of basic facts—help children discover patterns and relations and use these arithmetic regularities to invent reasoning strategies, not the memorization of basic facts by rote via drill and practice. A theoretical implication is that mental-arithmetic experts may rely on multiple strategies that become automatic.

Baroody found that, contrary to the conventional wisdom at the time, children with serious learning difficulties could benefit from formal mathematics instruction if general cognitive principle of learning were honored. Children with IQs of less than 75 or even 50, could self-correct counting errors; could learn to determine which number is larger; invent more efficient counting strategies to determine sums; and discover basic arithmetic regularities such as additive commutativity, the number-after rule for adding one, and the zero rule. He found that developmental level or readiness, not IQ, was predictive of learning success.

Proponents of the skills-first view argued that subitizing, verbal counting, and one-to-one counting by preschoolers were not meaningful but merely skills learned by rote. In contrast, nativists proposed a some-concepts-first view—that subitizing does not exists and that innate counting concepts guided the learning of verbal-based counting knowledge. Baroody proposed an iterative view of conceptual and procedural development view—a middle ground perspective between the skills-first view and the some-concepts-first view. According to the iterative view, children gradually construct an understanding of small numbers by seeing examples of a number labeled with a particular number word and nonexamples of the number labeled with other number words. Small-number concepts provide a meaningful basis for the skill of subitizing small numbers. Subitizing, in turn, serves to promote number, counting, and arithmetic development. For instance, contrary to conventional wisdom, subitizing-based number recognition of small numbers appears to develop before and serve as a basis for creating small collections.

Baroody’s view of the interdependence of conceptual and procedural knowledge differs from others in some key respects. One is that, although relatively superficial procedural and conceptual knowledge may exist independently, relatively deep procedural knowledge cannot not exist without relatively deep conceptual knowledge or vice versa. The depth of knowledge depends on its number of connections to other knowledge, accuracy, degree of organization, and generality or breadth. Another difference with other views is that big idea—overarching concepts that connect multiple concepts, procedures, or problems within or even across domains or topics—facilitate the construction of both deep conceptual and procedural knowledge.

Later research efforts focused on how instruction could promote meaningful number, counting and arithmetic learning by fostering both conceptual and procedural knowledge. In terms of counting development, children initially learn to count collections in a one-to-one fashion but do not understand that this is useful in determining the total (cardinal value) of a collection. A child may count five blocks accurately, but when asked how many blocks there are, guess incorrectly or recount the collection. Basically, such children do not understand the cardinality principle—that the last number word used in one-to-one counting has special meaning because it represents the total. Modeling the cardinal principle with small subitizable collections can help children see that the last number word in the one-to-one counting process is the total and discover the principle.

In a series of experiments, Baroody found that promoting the discovering of arithmetic relations could promote the invention of various arithmetic reasoning strategies and fluency with basic sums and differences. This approach was as efficacious in promoting fluency with practiced facts as the same amount of drill and practice and significantly more successful than drill and practice in promoting transfer to unpracticed but related facts. He also helped provide the first controlled experiments on the use of learning progression as an important tool in improving instruction. This research also indicated that in some domain such as patterning, further work is needed to define the learning progression or that lower levels in a progression serve only to facilitate (rather than as necessary prerequisites for) higher levels.

== Works ==
In 1983, Baroody helped Ginsburg develop a novel early mathematical achievement test that assessed children’s informal, as well as their formal, mathematical knowledge, namely the Test of Early Mathematics Achievement (TEMA).

In 2003, Baroody helped edit a book on adaptive expertise—conceptually based knowledge that can be applied to new tasks or situations as well familiar ones. Contributions to the book underscore the advantages of fostering adaptive expertise as opposed to routine expertise: procedures learned by rote memorization, which can usually be applied only to familiar tasks or situations. A key educational implication is that promoting meaningful learning is more powerful in promoting appropriate use of knowledge, including transfer.

In a 2017 chapter of the National Council of Teachers of Mathematics’ Compendium for Research in Mathematics Education, Baroody reviewed the research on whole-number operations in early childhood. The theme was the interconnectedness of learning, including how early (informal) learning in the domain provides a foundation for school (formal) learning. As an example, he outlined a number-sense view of basic number-fact learning—how fluency with basic sums and differences in the primary grades depends on development in the preschool starting with subitizing.

Baroody has written over 30 practitioner-oriented books, chapters, and articles on teaching mathematics to preschool, primary, and special-education children. He was an early proponent that using manipulatives does not guarantee meaningful learning. The effective use of manipulatives depends on carefully considering a learning goal, a child’s developmental level, and how the manipulatives are used.

Baroody served as the co-author of the Institute of Education Science’s early numeracy practice guide. This publication represented an effort to review the evidence and recommend best practices regarding early childhood mathematics education. Recommendations included using developmental progressions and progress monitoring to ensure that math instruction builds on what each child knows and dedicate time each day to teaching math and integrate such instruction throughout the school day.

== Awards and honors ==
- 1990 – UIUC College of Education Scholar Award
- 1997–98 – UIUC College of Education Distinguished Senior Scholar
- 1987–90 & 1999–2001 – Awarded a UIUC College of Education faculty fellowship (appointment to the Bureau of Educational Research)
- 2011 – Recognized as AERJ-THLD Excellent Reviewer
- 2020 – Recognized as JRME Outstanding Reviewer

== Bibliography ==
=== Books ===
- Children's Mathematical Thinking: A Developmental Framework for Preschool, Primary, and Special Education Teachers (1987) ISBN 9780807728376
- El pensamiento matemático de los niños. (Spanish translation of Children’s Mathematical Thinking.) (1988)
- Elementary Mathematics Activities: A Teacher's Guidebook (1989) ISBN 9780205118311
- Problem Solving, Reasoning, and Communicating, Grades K to 8: Helping children think mathematically (1992) ISBN 9780023064883
- Fostering Children's Mathematical Power: An Investigative Approach To K–8 Mathematics Instruction (1998) ISBN 978-0805831054
- Children’s mathematical thinking: A developmental framework for preschool, primary, and special education teachers. (Chinese edition of Children’s Mathematical Thinking) (2000)
- The development of arithmetic concepts and skills: Constructing adaptive expertise. (2003) ISBN 0-8058-3155-X
- IES Practice Guide: Teaching Math to Young Children. (2013) NCEE 2014-4005

=== Selected articles ===
- Paliwal, Veena; Baroody, Arthur J. (August 2020). "Cardinality principle understanding: the role of focusing on the subitizing ability". ZDM. 52 (4): 649–661. doi:10.1007/s11858-020-01150-0.
- Baroody, A. J., Yilmaz, N., Clements, D. H., & Sarama, J. (2021). "Evaluating a basic assumption of learning trajectories: The case of early patterning learning". J. Math. Educ, 13, 8–32.
- Baroody, Arthur J.; Clements, Douglas H.; Sarama, Julie (10 March 2022). "Lessons Learned from 10 Experiments That Tested the Efficacy and Assumptions of Hypothetical Learning Trajectories". Education Sciences. 12 (3): 195. doi:10.3390/educsci12030195.
- Baroody, A. J., & Lai, M. (2022). "The development and assessment of counting-based cardinal number concepts". Educational Studies in Mathematics, 1–21.
- Baroody, Arthur J.; Mix, Kelly S.; Kartal, Gamze; Lai, Meng-lung (31 March 2023). "The development and assessment of early cardinal-number concepts". Journal of Numerical Cognition. 9 (1): 182–195. doi:10.5964/jnc.10035. hdl:20.500.12034/8340.
