= Milwaukee Public Museum =

Public museum in Milwaukee, Wisconsin, US

Coordinates: 43.040744°N 87.921095°W

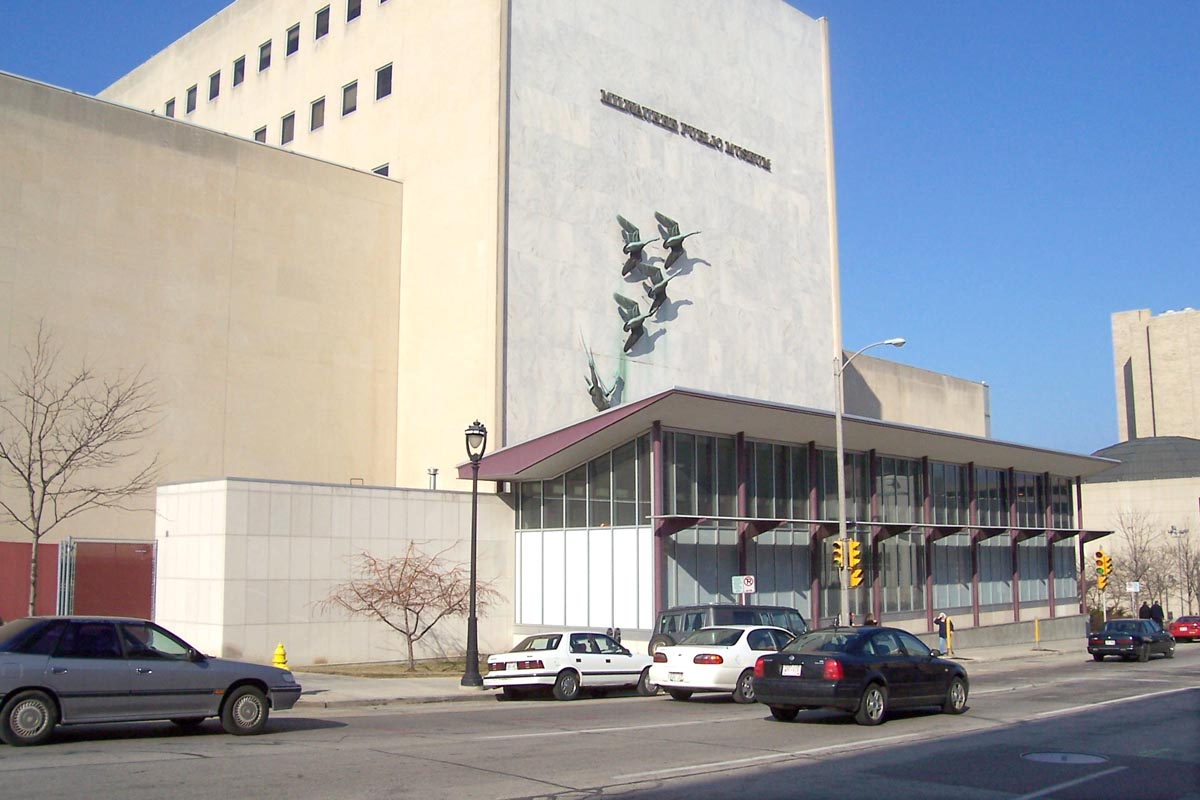
- Current museum building on West Wells St
- Established: 1882
- Location: 800 West Wells Street; Milwaukee, Wisconsin; United States
- Type: Public museum
- Collection size: 4 million
- Visitors: 501,887 (2024)
- President: Ellen J. Censky
- Owners: MPM, Inc.
- Public transit access: MCTS 12, 30, BlueLine, Connect 1
- Website: www.mpm.edu

The Milwaukee Public Museum is a natural and human history museum in the Westown neighborhood of Downtown Milwaukee, Wisconsin. The museum was chartered in 1882 and opened to the public in 1884. The museum has three floors of exhibits and the first IMAX theater in Wisconsin in its current complex on West Wells St. With over 500,000 visitors per year, it is the most visited museum in the state.

In May 2024, the museum broke ground on a new five-story facility at the corner of N 6th St and W McKinley Ave, in the neighborhood of Haymarket, to be completed in 2027. A year later, the museum announced that the new building will be known as Nature & Culture Museum of Wisconsin, while adopting a new visual identity.

== History ==
=== The German-English Academy ===
MPM was one of several major American museums established in the late 19th century. Although it was officially chartered in 1882, its existence can be traced back to 1851, to the founding of the German-English Academy in Milwaukee. The academy's principal, Peter Engelmann, encouraged student field trips, many of which collected various specimens—organic, geological, and archaeological in nature—which were kept at the academy. Later, alumni and others donated specimens of historical and ethnological interest to the collection.

By 1857, interest in the academy's collection had grown to such an extent that Engelmann organized a natural history society to manage and expand the collection. Eventually, the collection, which had come to be informally called "The Museum", exceeded the academy's ability to accommodate it. August Stirn, a city alderman and member of the national history society, obtained legislation from the state legislature for the City of Milwaukee to accept the collection and take the measures to establish "a free public museum".

=== Early years ===
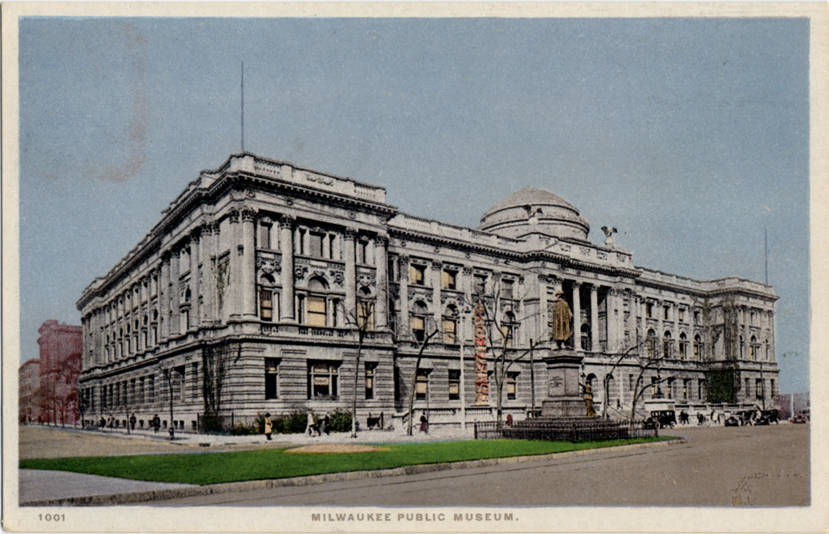
A 1930s view of the former museum building on Wisconsin Ave, now the Milwaukee Central Library

The newly formed Board of Trustees hired Carl Doerflinger to be the museum's first director and rented space to place exhibits. The Milwaukee Public Museum opened to the public on May 24, 1884. Doerflinger placed emphasis on using MPM's exhibits for study and research as well as for public education. He also urged the city to purchase land on which a building could be constructed to house the museum and the Milwaukee Public Library. He resigned in 1888. The new museum building at 814 W. Wisconsin Avenue was completed in 1898.

In 1890, Carl Akeley, a taxidermist and biologist noted as the "father of modern taxidermy", completed the first complete museum habitat diorama in the world, depicting a muskrat colony.

Henry L. Ward was hired as MPM's fourth director in 1902. Previously, the museum had focused solely on the natural sciences, but this changed when Ward began the creation of a History Museum. To further this goal, Samuel A. Barrett, the recipient of the first doctorate in anthropology awarded by the University of California, was selected to head an anthropology-history department.

Barrett later succeeded Ward and led the museum through the Great Depression of the 1930s. Barrett used the Works Progress Administration and other New Deal programs to keep the museum running and to create employment beyond the existing staff.

=== Modern history ===
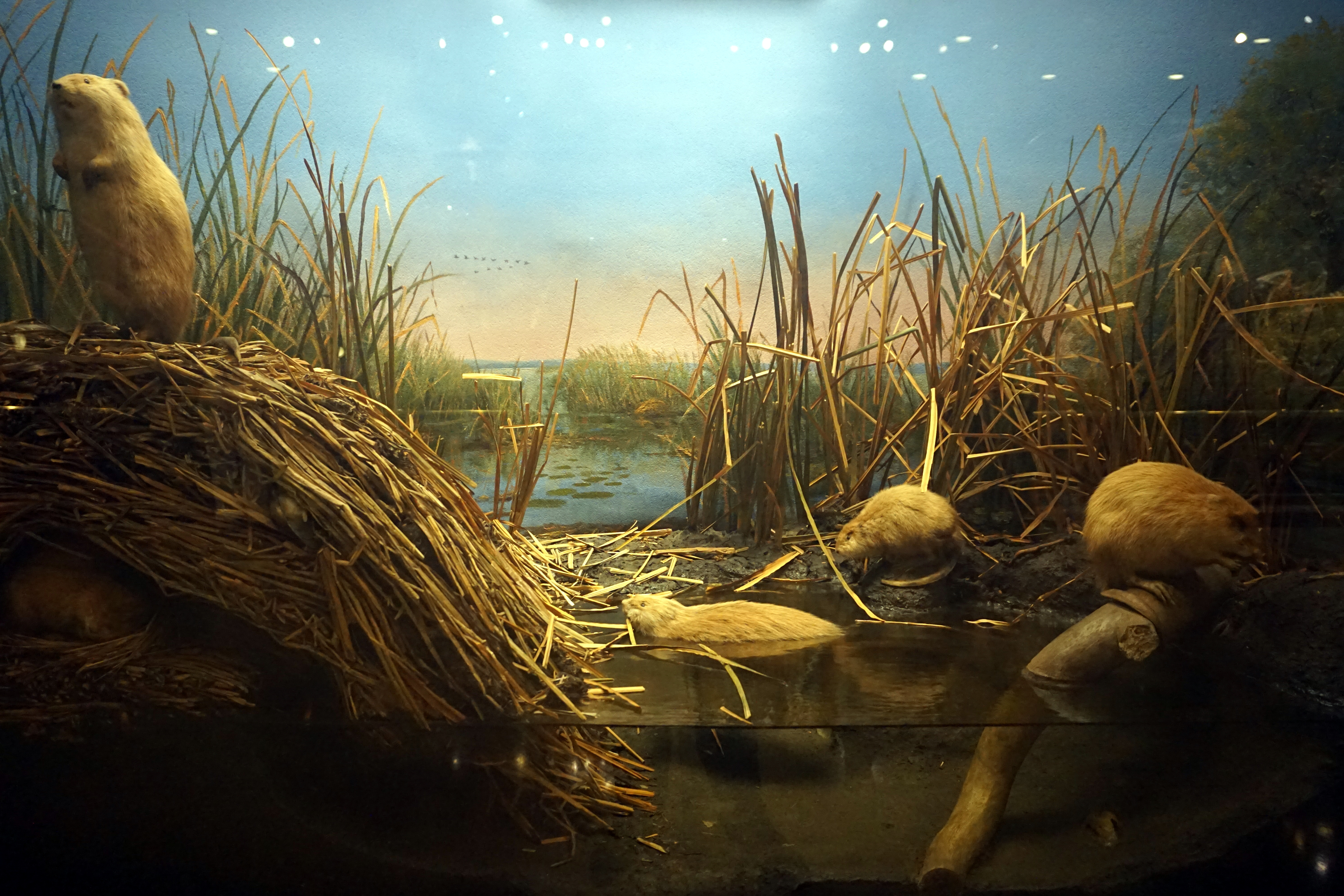
Akeley's muskrat diorama

Construction on MPM's current building began in 1960 and was completed in 1962. The current site is at 800 W. Wells Street, a block north of the old Museum-Library building, still the home of the Milwaukee Central Library, which continued to house exhibits until 1966.

A controversy over the imposition of admittance fees on visitors who were not residents of the City of Milwaukee led to the museum being sold by the city to Milwaukee County in 1976. In 1992, amid assertions that the museum was on the verge of bankruptcy and might have to be sold or completely privatized, a compromise was reached in which the county retained the museum's nominal ownership but all operating control was handed over to Milwaukee Public Museum, Inc., a not-for-profit controlled by local business interests such as Miller Brewing. Employee wages and benefits were reduced, but private donations expanded and the county's share of costs was diminished.

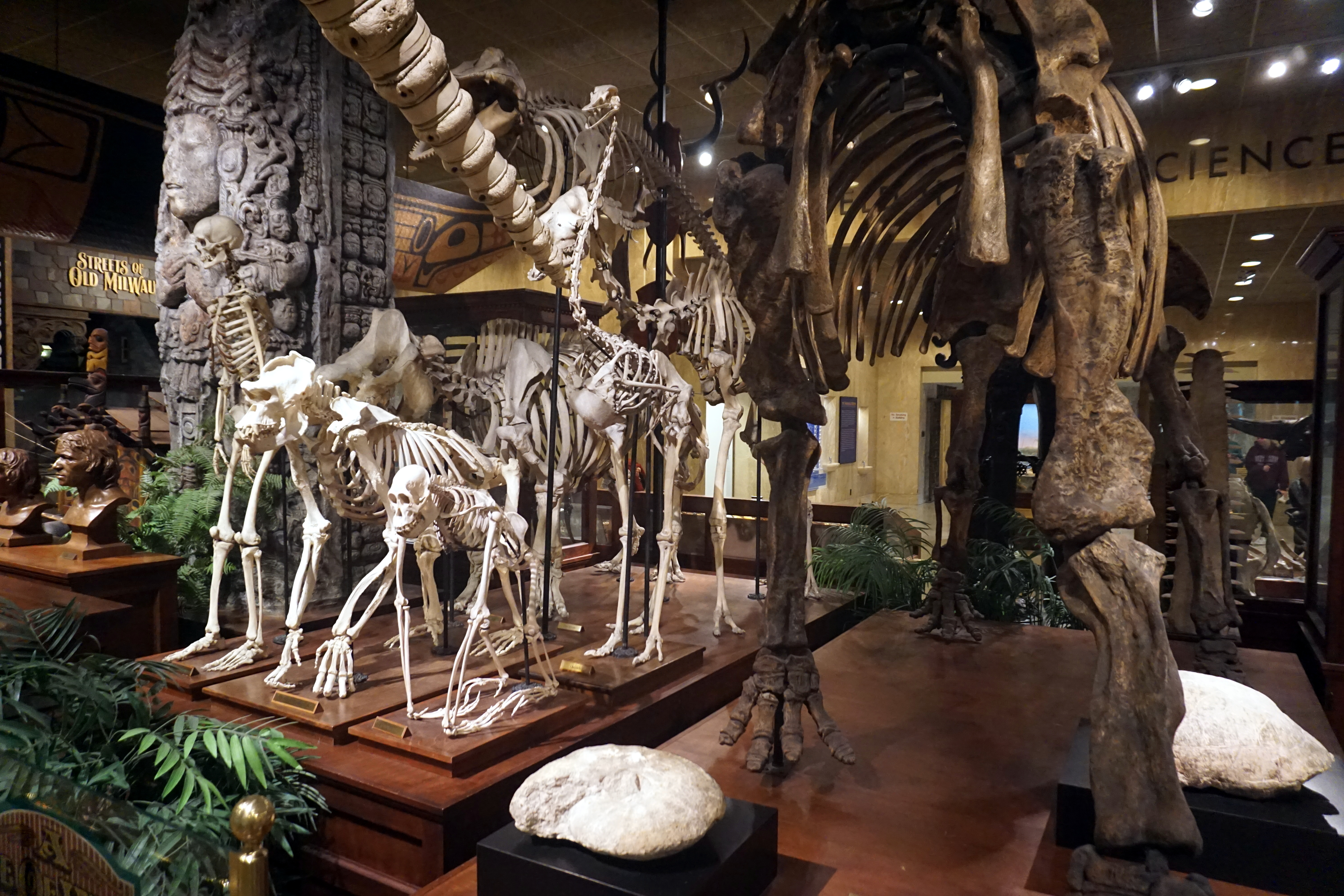
A Sense of Wonder in the first floor lobby, done in the style of the early museum

In 2006, charges were filed against former museum chief financial officer Terry Gaouette, following the revelation that the museum was several million dollars in the red, a fact that allegedly had been hidden for years by illegal money transfers. Gaouette pleaded guilty to one misdemeanor charge of falsifying a financial report. His CPA license was restored in 2010.

In 2010, the Milwaukee Public Museum appointed a new director Jay B. Williams, formerly of PrivateBank. He has focused on fundraising and improving repeat traffic.

In 2014, MPM hired Dennis Kois as president and CEO. During his tenure the museum saw the highest quarters of attendance in its 140-year history and following several years of development and a unanimous vote by the museum board to proceed, plans and renderings were publicly announced for a $180 million new museum. In August 2018 Kois resigned, following a Board investigation of a consensual relationship between him and a staff member. Kois and his wife had filed for divorce earlier that same year.

Ellen Censky had been named the interim president and CEO while the MPM Board of Directors conducted a nationwide search for the position.

At the conclusion of the search in June 2019, Dr. Ellen Censky was officially named president and CEO

=== New facility ===
In 2017, the Milwaukee Public Museum announced their intention to relocate after results from a two-year study indicated the existing museum was in need of extensive and costly repairs.

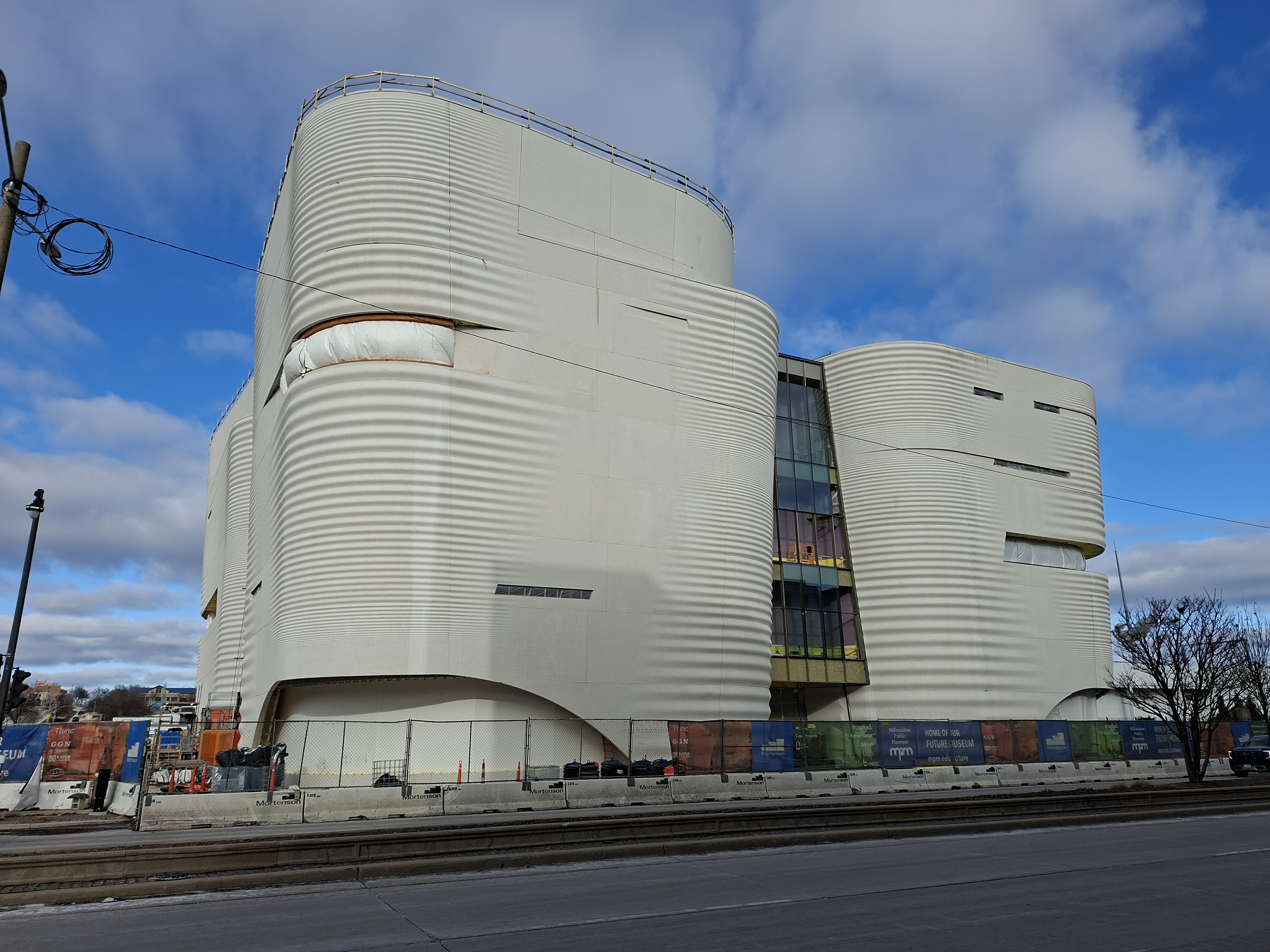
The museum in construction in January 2026

In 2020, MPM revealed the new construction's location on a 2.4-acre (0.97-hectare) site along North Sixth Street, between West McKinley Avenue and West Vliet Street. Designs for the US$240 million project were released in 2022, featuring a five-story, 200,000-square-foot (19,000 m^{2}) building.

The project broke ground in May 2024 and estimated to open in early 2027.

== Permanent exhibits and collections ==
The Milwaukee Public Museum houses three floors of both permanent and traveling exhibits. The first major exhibit in the current museum to be completed was Streets of Old Milwaukee, which opened in January 1965. It is one of the more popular exhibits in MPM, and it is estimated that several million people have visited it since its completion.

Totaling more than 4 million artifacts, collections at the Milwaukee Public Museum notably include:

=== Ground Floor ===
- A 14,500-year-old woolly mammoth skeleton, known as the Hebior Mammoth, excavated in Kenosha County in the 1990s. The real bones are too fragile to display or mount and are preserved for research, but a fiberglass replica set is on display at the museum.
- The Daniel M. Soref Planetarium (formerly the Humphrey IMAX Dome Theater), the first IMAX theater in Wisconsin.
- The ground floor also features a café and a gift shop.

=== First Floor ===
- A recreation taxidermy of Samson the Gorilla, a beloved animal at the Milwaukee County Zoo.
- The Peulicher Butterfly Wing, which features over 1000 species of butterflies.
- Hell Creek, a diorama in the Third Planet exhibit based on the Hell Creek Formation, features a Tyrannosaurus rex eating the innards of a Triceratops. Notably, during the COVID-19 pandemic, the Tyrannosaurus was given a face mask.
- The Streets of Old Milwaukee, where visitors walk through a trolley to enter a recreation of Downtown Milwaukee during the Progressive Era. Famous landmarks such as the Pfister Hotel are recreated in the exhibit. Its sister exhibit, European Village, features homes in which each room represents a country in Europe.

=== Second Floor ===
- Crow Indian Bison Hunt, a diorama which features two Crow people hunting bison on horseback. It was reputed to be the largest open diorama at its debut in 1966.
- A Tribute to Survival, an exhibit which features Indian Country, a diorama of a modern powwow with 37 life size figures.
- The second floor also features North America, an exhibit which comprises the majority of the second floor.

=== Third Floor ===
- Pre-Columbian Mezzanine, a mezzanine which featured an extensive collection of pottery, carvings, jewelry, and other archaeological artifacts from Mesoamerica. The exhibit featured two Peruvian Chancay Mummies, which were removed in 2024. The mezzanine was permanently closed in 2025.
- Africa, Arctic, South & Middle America, Pacific Islands, exhibits which display the regions of the world.

=== Archives ===
- A collection and digital archive of over 10,000 bird eggs from around the world, focused on birds native to Wisconsin.
- The largest collection of Silurian fossils in the world, comprising 122,000 specimens.
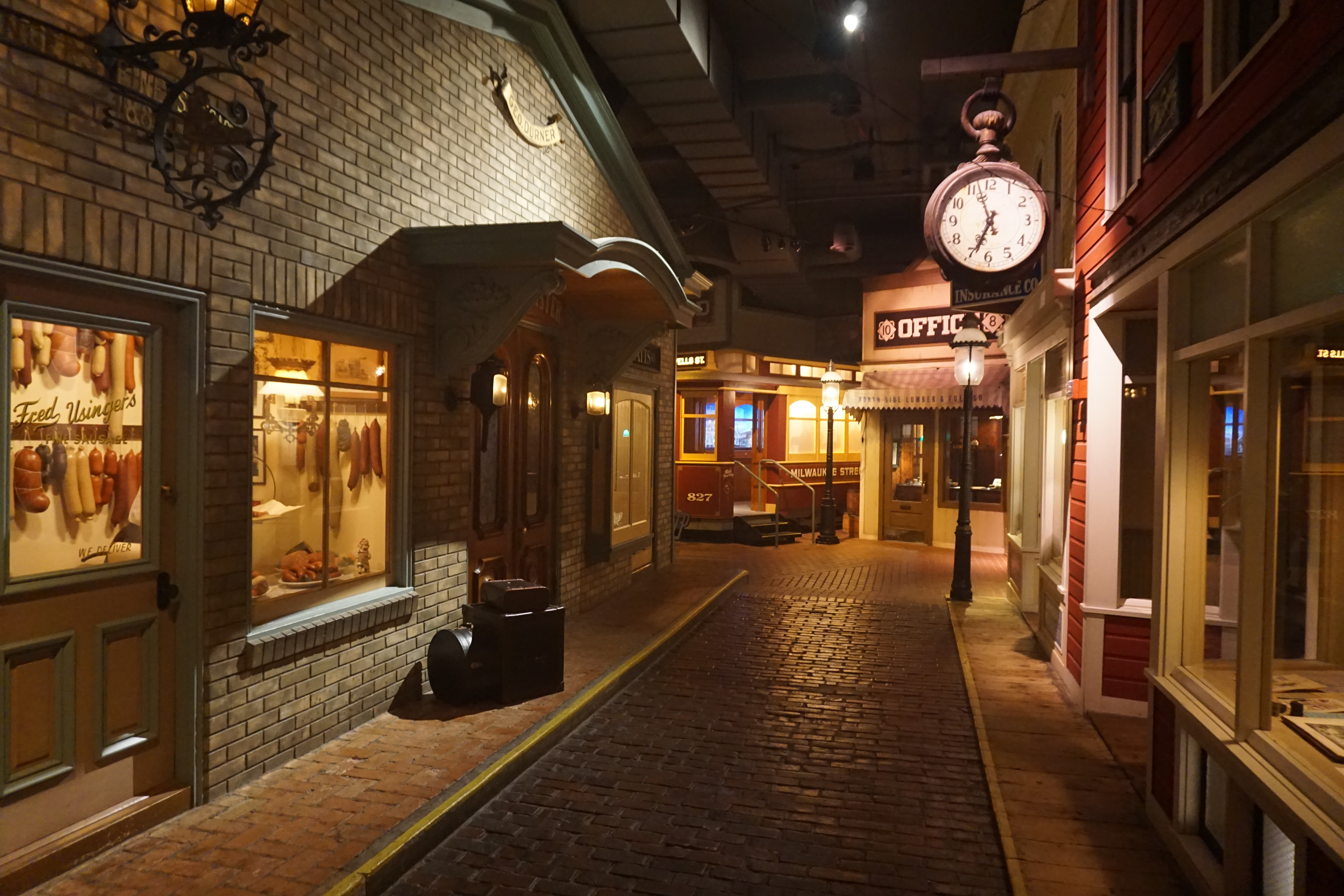
Streets of Old Milwaukee exhibit

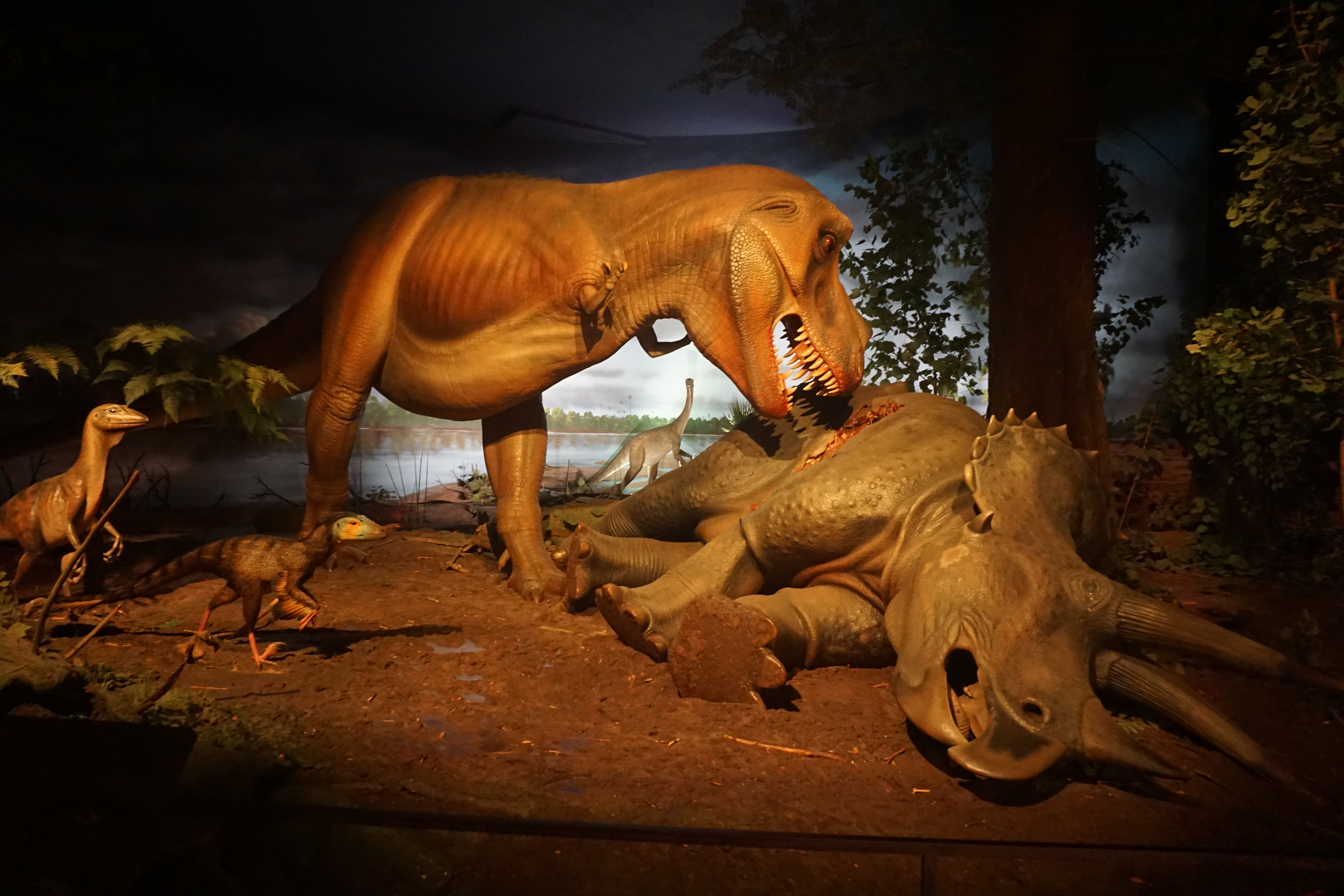
A Tyrannosaurus rex eating a Triceratops as a Dromaeosaurus and Struthiomimus watch in the Third Planet exhibit

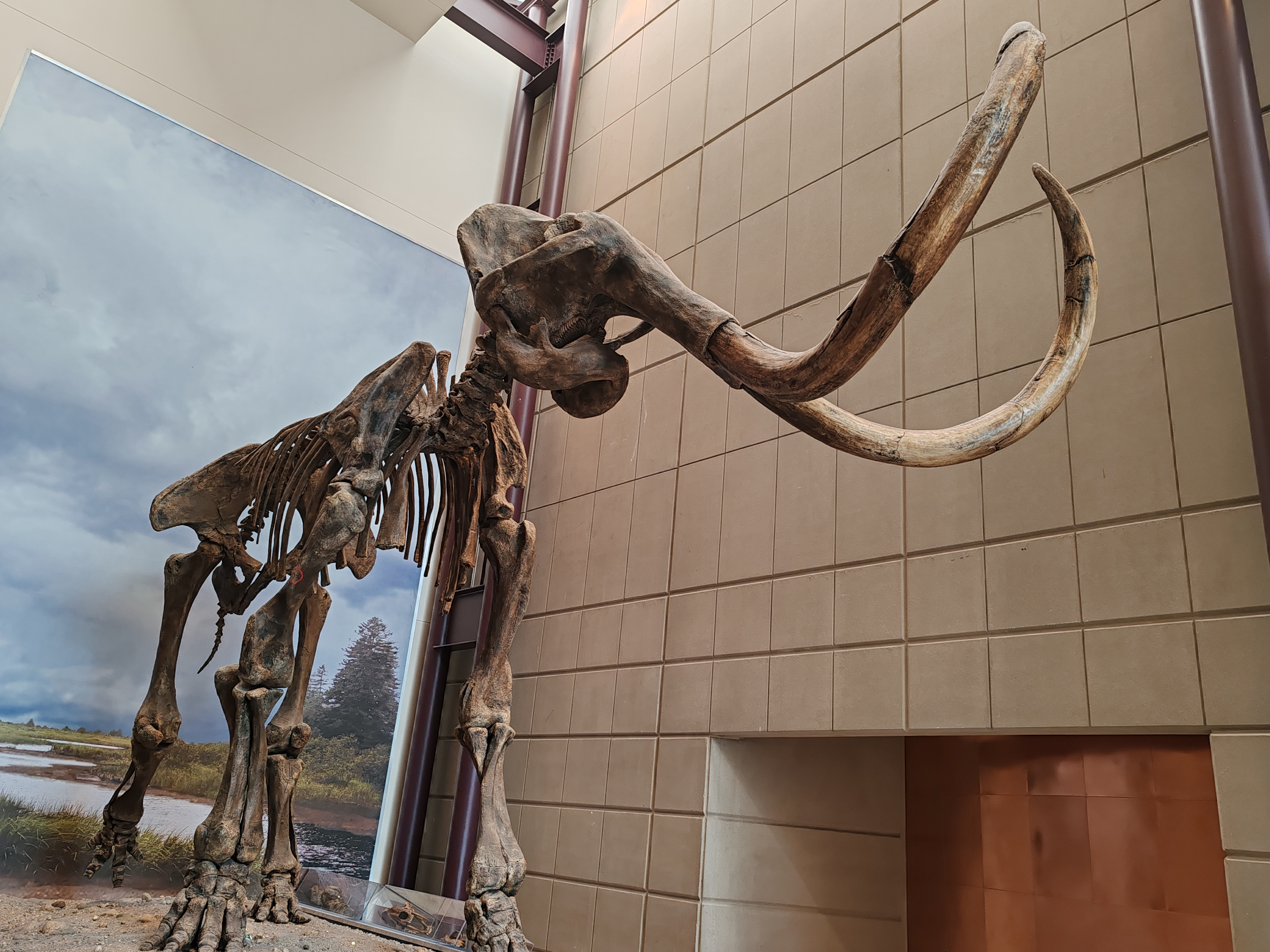
The Hebior Mammoth, excavated in the town of Paris, Kenosha County, in the 1990s
