= Direct Supply =

American healthcare supply company

Direct Supply, Inc.
- Company type: Private
- Founded: 1985
- Founder: Bob Hillis
- Headquarters: Milwaukee, Wisconsin, United States
- Area served: Global
- Products: Equipment & furnishings Development services Building management Procurement automation Technology solutions
- Number of employees: 1,300+
- Website: www.DirectSupply.com

Direct Supply is a private company that specializes in providing equipment, eCommerce, and services to healthcare organizations and the senior living industry. Founded in 1985 and headquartered in Milwaukee, Wisconsin, the company offers its products and services to healthcare organizations, skilled nursing, and assisted living communities throughout the United States. As of 2011, Direct Supply employed more than 1,300 people on its mile-long, eleven-building campus in Milwaukee. It has an employee ownership structure. In 2007, the company opened its first international office in China.

== History ==
Direct Supply was cofounded in 1985 by Bob Hillis. The business began as a direct-mail supplier of housekeeping and maintenance equipment, before finding its niche in senior living.After introducing its first healthcare catalog in 1988, the company defined its corporate mission: to enhance the lives of America's seniors through commitment to senior living.

== Lines of business ==
Direct Supply has multiple major lines of business.

Direct Supply Equipment & Furnishings is the company's flagship division, supplying healthcare facilities with healthcare equipment, clinical equipment, rehabilitation equipment, foodservice equipment, maintenance equipment, and furniture. Direct Supply also owns a variety of proprietary brands including Panacea, Attendant, Maxwell Thomas and Direct Choice.

Direct Supply DSSI is an eProcurement system that links more than 10,000 senior living facilities to their supply chain and moves about $3 billion worth of product per year.

Direct Supply TELS is a technology-based system for delivering life safety, asset management, maintenance, and repair services to building management professionals.

Direct Supply Aptura offers services including interior design, foodservice design and furniture, fixtures, and equipment (FF&E) procurement, focusing solely on the senior living industry.

== Technology focus ==
Direct Supply is a "virtual" distributor of equipment—it operates without directly owning warehouses or factories. The company's founder, President and CEO, Bob Hillis, remarked that Direct Supply operated through "legions of smart people and computers."

Direct Supply partnered with the Milwaukee School of Engineering (MSOE) in 2012 to open a technology center on the MSOE campus. Occupying more than 9,000 square feet (840 m^{2}) in the German-English Academy building on MSOE's campus, the center has the capacity to hold 60 Direct Supply computer engineers and technology interns.

In 2013, Direct Supply joined the MGrid consortium, a high-performance, technical computing network that helps public and private partners with technically challenging research problems involving modeling, simulation and visualization. The company uses MGrid to do analytics research on large amounts of data.

== Community outreach ==
Direct Supply is involved with numerous local and national charities and non-profit organizations. Local involvement includes sponsoring and employee volunteering at neighborhood senior living communities, SeniorFest at Milwaukee's Summerfest, Al's Run/Walk for Children's Hospital, Milwaukee's Hunger Task Force, Garfield Avenue Festival, and YMCA Teen Summit. Nationally, Direct Supply works with organizations to influence senior living policy change in Washington, D.C.

== Culture ==
Direct Supply has an employee-ownership structure and refers to its employees as "partners". Nearly all Direct Supply employees hold shares of Direct Supply stock in their 401(k) account.
