= Erich C. Stern =

American politician and lawyer

Erich Cramer Stern (February 8, 1879 – February 18, 1969) was an American politician and lawyer.

Born in Milwaukee, Wisconsin, Stern graduated from the German-English Academy in Milwaukee, Wisconsin. Stern received his bachelor's degree from Harvard University in 1901 and his law degree from Harvard Law School in 1904. In 1905, Stern received his doctorate degree from University of Paris. He was admitted to the Wisconsin Bar in 1905 and practiced law in Milwaukee. He also taught law at Marquette University from 1915 to 1920. From 1908 to 1910, Stern served on the Milwaukee Common Council. In 1911, Stern served in the Wisconsin State Assembly and was a Republican.
