= Bob Jake =

American basketball player

Personal information
- Born: January 9, 1923 Milwaukee, Wisconsin, US
- Died: November 30, 2013 (aged 90) Yountville, California, US

Career information
- College: Northwestern (1942–1943); Vermont (1946–1947)
- BAA draft: 1947: 2nd round, 16th overall pick
- Drafted by: Baltimore Bullets

Career history
- 1947–1948: Glens Falls Commodores
- Stats at Basketball Reference

Robert John Jake (January 9, 1923 – November 30, 2013) was an American basketball player and doctor. Jake played basketball for both Northwestern and Vermont and was the 16th overall selection by the Baltimore Bullets in the 1947 BAA Draft, the forerunner to the NBA.

== Playing career ==
A native of Milwaukee, Wisconsin, Jake attended Milwaukee University School, now known as University School of Milwaukee, where he set school records in basketball for scoring. Jake was also an accomplished tennis player, securing the National Boys Singles and Doubles Tennis Championships in 1938. He went on to be the #1 ranked boys' tennis player in the nation in 1939. Jake then attended Northwestern University where he lettered in basketball and tennis from 1942 to 1943. He volunteered for the United States Army during World War II in 1943, where he served stateside and studied medicine at the University of Vermont. After the war, Jake lettered for his final season at Vermont, finishing second on the team in scoring behind fellow BAA draft pick Larry Killick helping the Catamounts to a 19–3 record and Yankee Conference regular season title under coach John C. Evans. The 19 wins was a school record until the 2001–02 season.

Jake was also a standout in doubles tennis at Vermont, as he and partner Hammond "Hammy" Livingston went 9–0 in 1949 to win the New England Championships.

Selected 16th overall in the BAA Draft to the Baltimore Bullets in 1947, Jake never suited up for the team, but did play in the semi-professional New York State Professional Basketball League for the 1947–48 season with the Glens Falls Commodores, alongside UVM teammate Killick. He and Killick remain the only two University of Vermont products to be taken in a major basketball league draft.

== After basketball ==
Jake completed his medical residency in Milwaukee, and also served as an Army doctor during the Korean War in 1952. In 1955, he began his medical career in California, where he practiced until 1996. Jake died on November 30, 2013, in Yountville, California.
