= Eckhart Grohmann =

German American businessman (born 1936)

Eckhart G. Grohmann
- Born: June 29, 1936 (age 90); Breslau, Germany
- Education: University of Mannheim
- Occupations: Businessman, Art collector
- Known for: Grohmann Museum

Eckhart Georg Grohmann (born June 29, 1936) is a German-American businessman and art collector. After emigrating to the United States in 1962, he acquired the Milwaukee-based Aluminum Casting & Engineering Company in 1965 and expanded its manufacturing operations. He has served on the Milwaukee School of Engineering's board of regents since 1990.

Grohmann is known for assembling a collection of European and American artwork depicting labor and industry. In 2001, he donated approximately 700 works to MSOE and later acquired a building in downtown Milwaukee to house the collection. The resulting Grohmann Museum opened in 2007 and was named in his honor.

== Early life and education ==
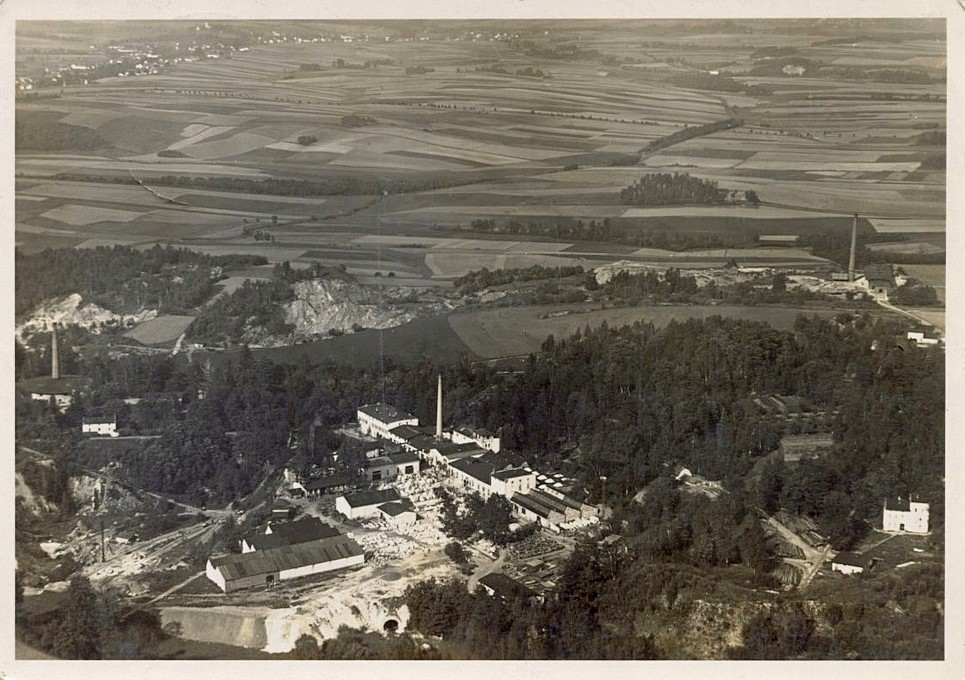
Thust Company marble quarry and plant in Sławniowice, c. 1930

Grohmann was born in 1936 in Breslau, then part of Lower Silesia, where his maternal family owned several quarries. Known as the Thust Company, the business was founded in 1819 in Gnadenfrei (now Piława Górna, Poland) by Grohmann’s great-great-grandfather Carl Christian Thust (1804–1877) and specialized in marble extraction and stonemasonry, in particular for gravestones. At the time of Grohmann’s birth, the firm was managed by his grandfather Willibald Thust (1875–1946). In the wake of WWII, and as a result of the Silesian offensives led by the Soviet Union in 1945, the family was forced out of the region and relocated their quarrying operations in Balduinstein, Rhineland-Palatinate.

After obtaining a Master’s degree in Business Administration from the University of Mannheim, Grohmann emigrated to the United States in 1962, where he settled in Milwaukee and married Carole Weisel (1926–2013), heir to the meat producer Weisel and Co., a competitor to the better-known local sausage maker Usinger's.

== Career ==
In 1965, he purchased the small Aluminum Casting & Engineering Co. With production growing, a second foundry in South Milwaukee was added to the business in 1974. Eckhart and Carole Grohmann divorced in 1982, and Grohmann later remarried. In the 1980s, Grohmann also operated an alarm company, which was eventually sold to Ameritech in 1997.

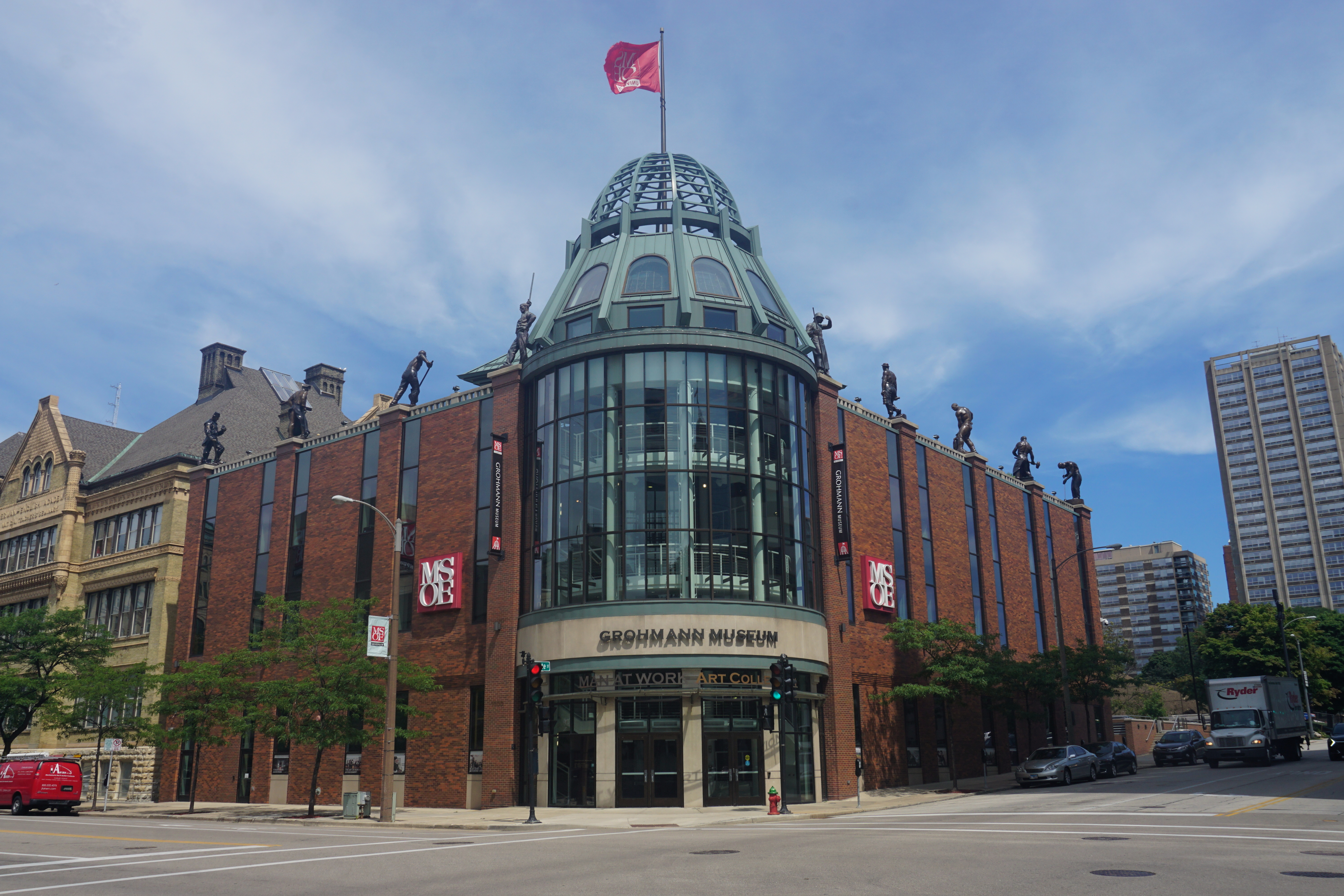
The Grohmann Museum, in downtown Milwaukee

Grohmann has served on the board of regents of the Milwaukee School of Engineering (MSOE) since 1990, and the school awarded him an honorary Ph.D. degree in Engineering in 1999. In 2001, he gifted MSOE his collection of about 700 European and American paintings, sculpture, and works on paper dealing with human labor, which he had started assembling in the 1960s. In addition, he purchased a former Cadillac dealership and Federal Reserve Bank office near campus in 2005 with the goal of converting it into a space to display the collections. The building reopened in October 2007 under the name of Grohmann Museum, which, on top of exhibition galleries, includes classrooms, faculty offices, and a library.
