= Grohmann Museum =

Art museum in Milwaukee, Wisconsin, United States

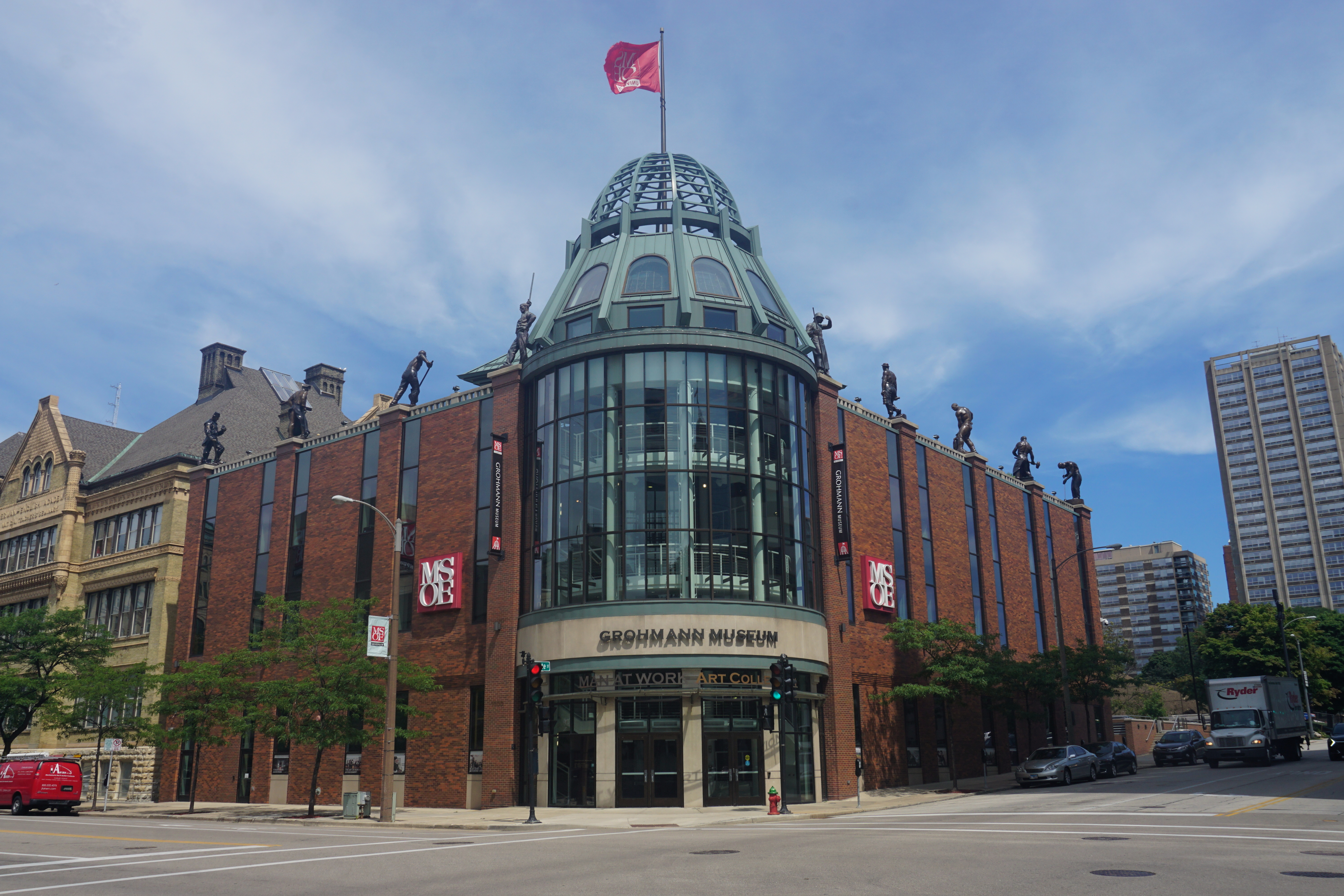
- Exterior of the Grohmann Museum in 2022
- Interactive fullscreen map
- Established: 2007; 19 years ago
- Location: 1000 N. Broadway; Milwaukee, Wisconsin; United States
- Coordinates: 43°02′38″N 87°54′29″W
- Type: Art museum
- Collection size: 2,000 works
- Director: James Kieselburg
- Public transit access: MCTS 15, 18, 30, 57, and Green Line; The Hop M-Line
- Website: www.msoe.edu/grohmann-museum/

The Grohmann Museum at the Milwaukee School of Engineering (MSOE) is an art museum located Milwaukee, Wisconsin, whose collection focuses on the historical evolution and visual representation of human labor.

The museum originated in 2001 after businessman Eckhart Grohmann (b. 1936), the former president of the Milwaukee Aluminum Casting & Engineering Company, gifted his art collection to the school, along with funding to operate a structure to display it. The museum building opened in 2007 in a renovated 1924 auto dealership building located next to the city's former German-English Academy.

Among the institution's 2,000 art pieces are a large group of works by German Romantic painter Carl Spitzweg, including versions of The Bookworm (on long-term loan from the Milwaukee Public Library) and The Poor Poet, two of his most famous compositions. The collection also comprises paintings and sculpture by European and American artists including Pieter Brueghel the Younger, Jan van Goyen, Ludwig Knaus, Eyre Crowe, John George Brown, Max Schlichting, Max Liebermann, Julien Dupré, Norman Rockwell, and Frederic Remington.

Both the ceiling painting and floor mural of the museum's entry hall were designed by contemporary German artist Hans Dieter Tylle.

== Labor Art Collection ==
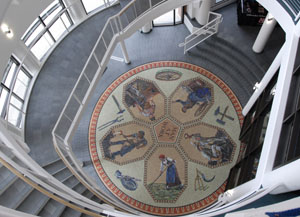
Atrium mosaic by Hans Dieter Tylle

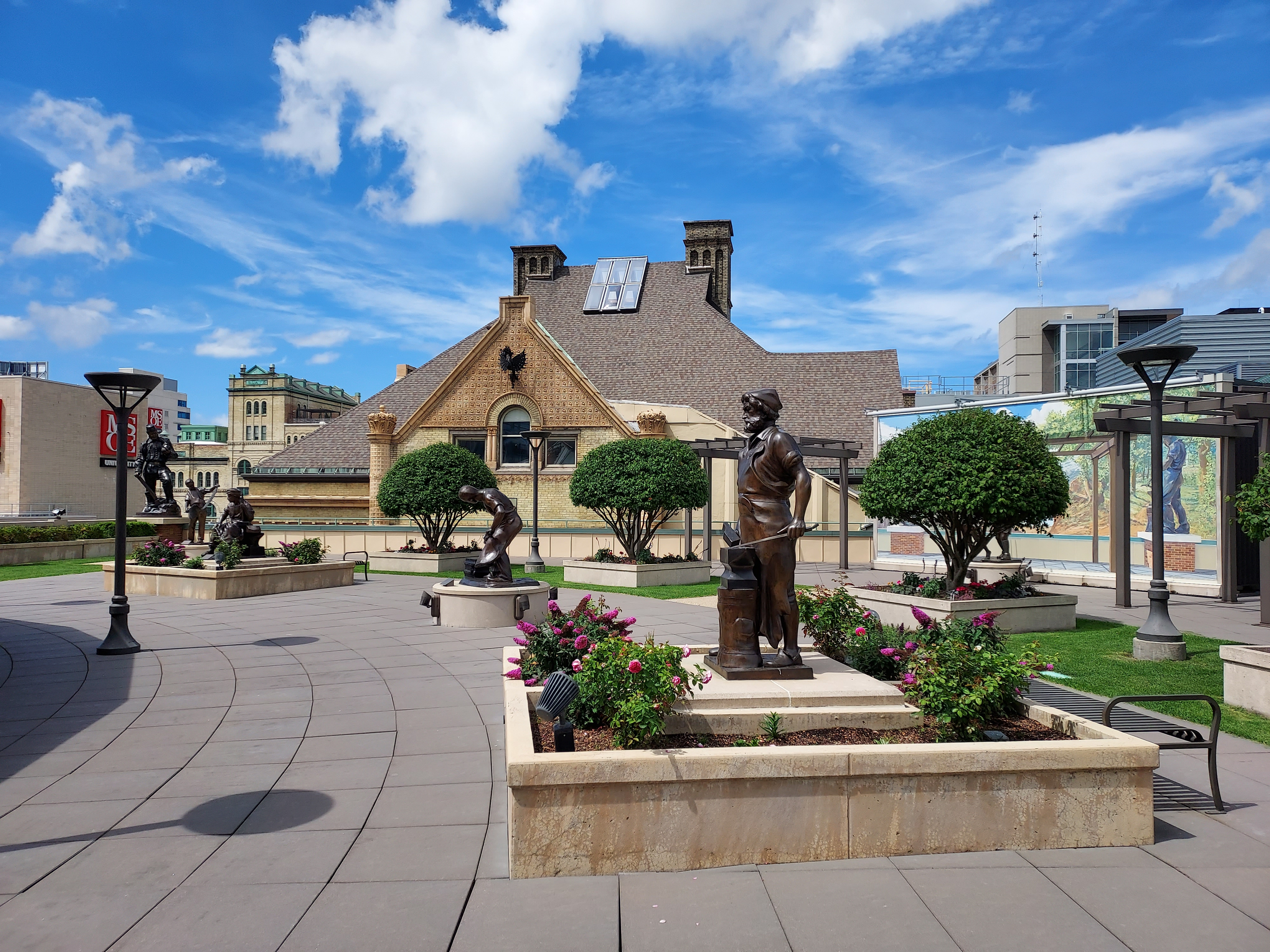
Rooftop sculpture garden

The Grohmann Museum collection contains over 2,000 European and American paintings, sculptures, and works on paper that depict various forms of labor. The objects reflect a variety of artistic styles and subjects that document the evolution of organized work, from manpower and horsepower to water, steam and electric power. The collection spans over 400 years of labor history (17th to 21st centuries).

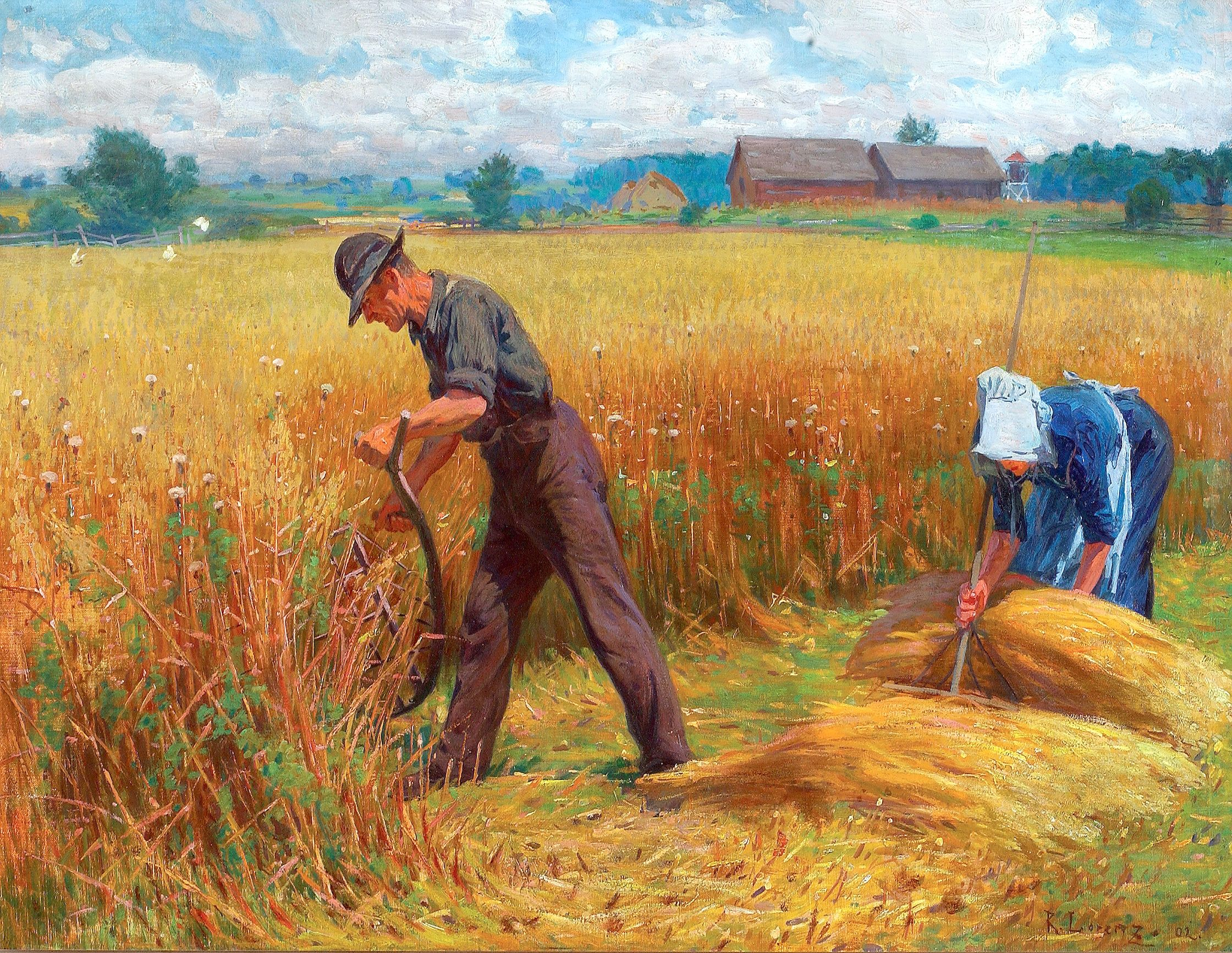
Richard Lorenz, Harvest Time, 1902

Earlier paintings depict handmade crafts and activities, while later images explore artists, craftspeople, and tradespeople during the Industrial and Post-Industrial Age. The collection also comprises 20th- and 21st-century paintings and sculpture addressing the paradoxes of industrialism and a machine-driven world. Some of these works were commissioned by factory owners to present favorable views of steel mills and foundries, yet some others adopt a grassroots approach to labor and social injustices. Most of the works in the collection were produced by German and Dutch artists, including German American painters from Wisconsin such as Carl von Marr and Richard Lorenz. A number of other European countries are also represented.

Since its opening, the museum has generated some controversy, particularly regarding links between some of the collection's artists like Erich Mercker (1891–1973) and the Nazi regime, the Eurocentric focus of the art on display, and Eckhart Grohmann's alleged history of anti-labor union positions. In 2014, the museum addressed the specific concerns over Mercker's work for Nazi authorities in the exhibition "Erich Mercker: Painter of Industry". The accompanying catalogue acknowledged that, while the artist was "not fanatical", his decision to join the NSDAP was definitely motivated by antisemitism, a rejection of avant-garde artistic styles, and worries about unemployment in Germany.

In 2015, the museum organized a retrospective exhibition of Carl Spitzweg's works in Milwaukee collections, which included nine paintings from the Milwaukee Art Museum.

== Gallery ==
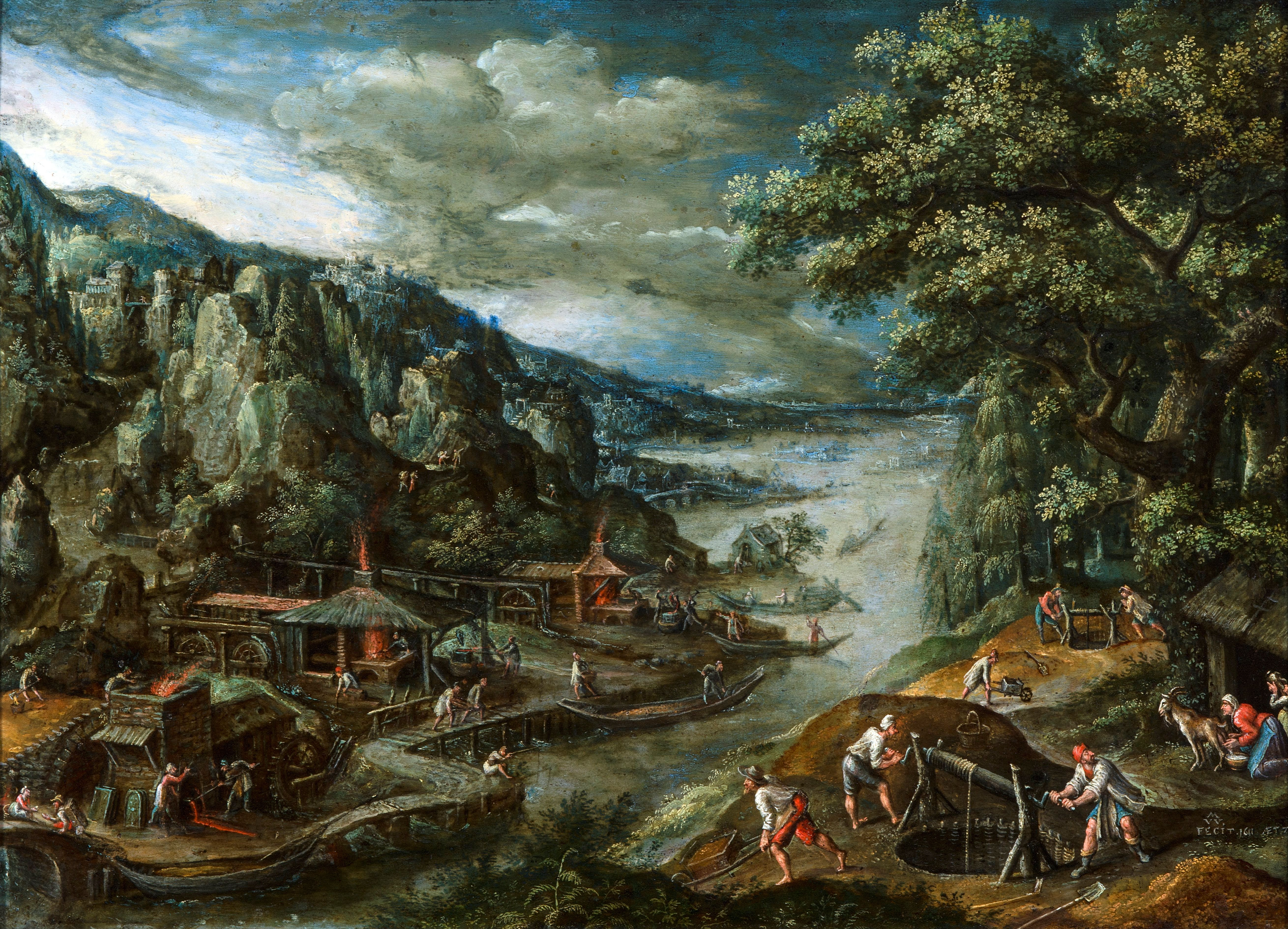
Marten van Valckenborch, River Landscape with Iron Mining Scene, 1611

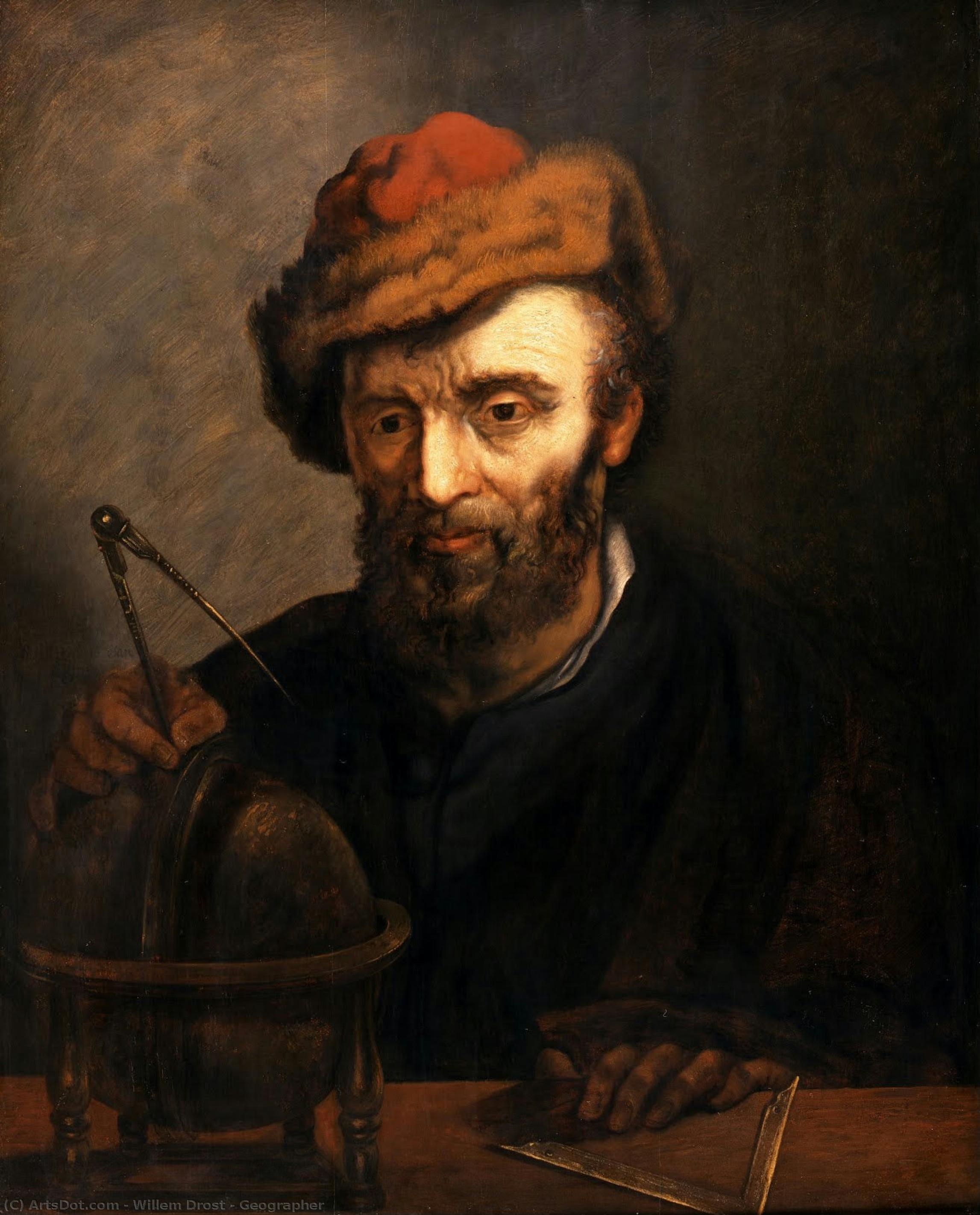
Willem Drost, Geographer, 1655

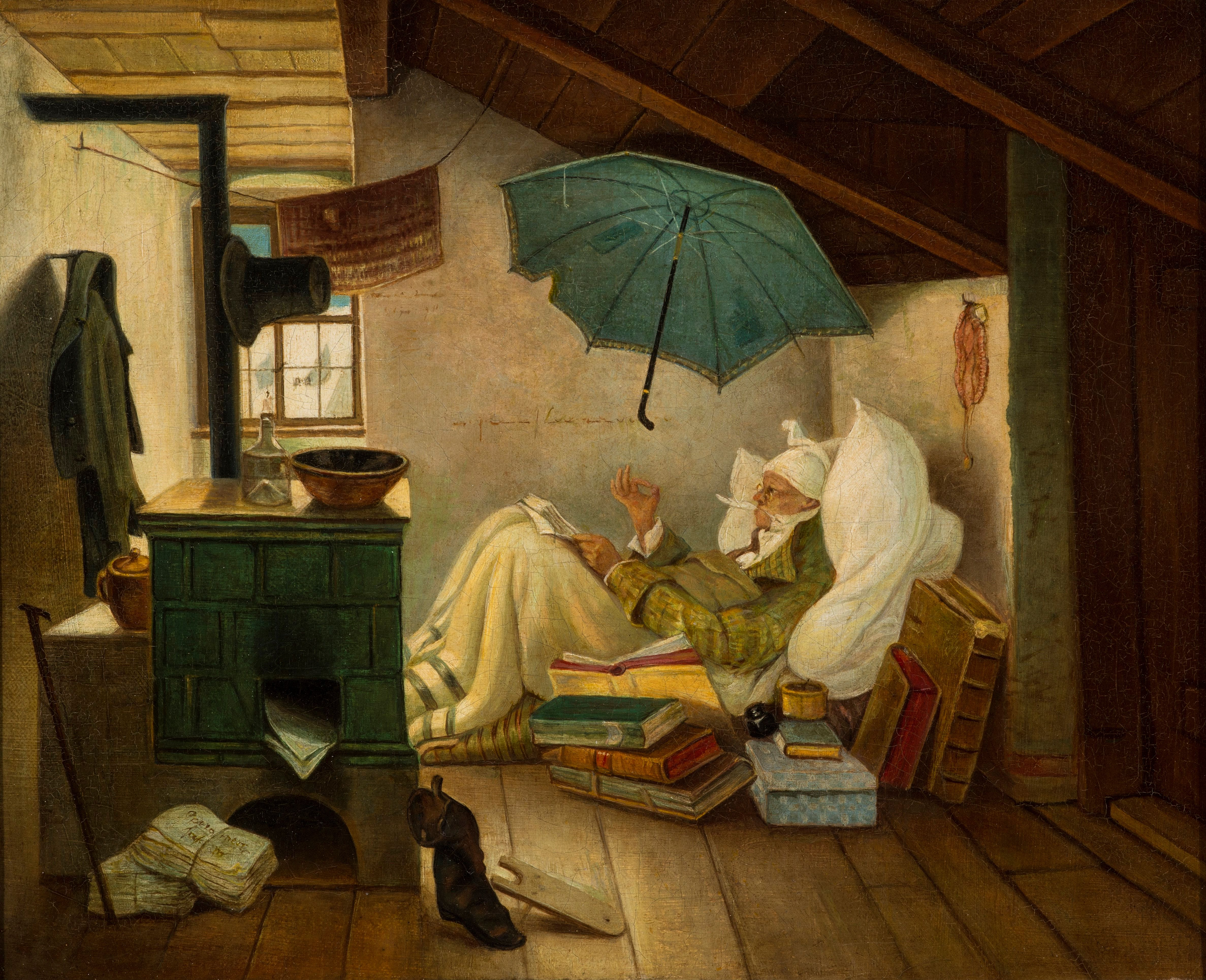
Carl Spitzweg, The Poor Poet, c. 1837-39

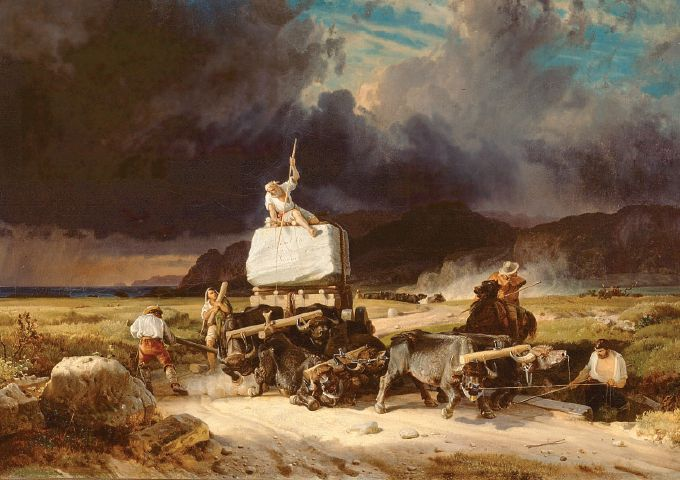
Friedrich Paul Nerly, Transporting Marble to the Sculptor Thorvaldsen in Rome, 1860-70

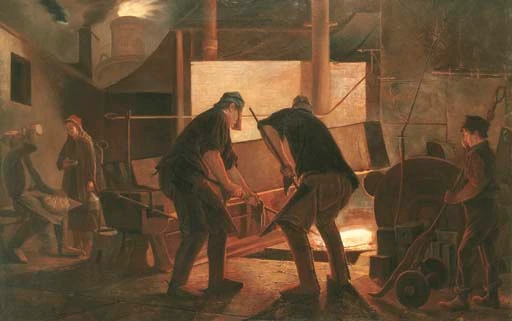
Eyre Crowe, The Forge, 1869

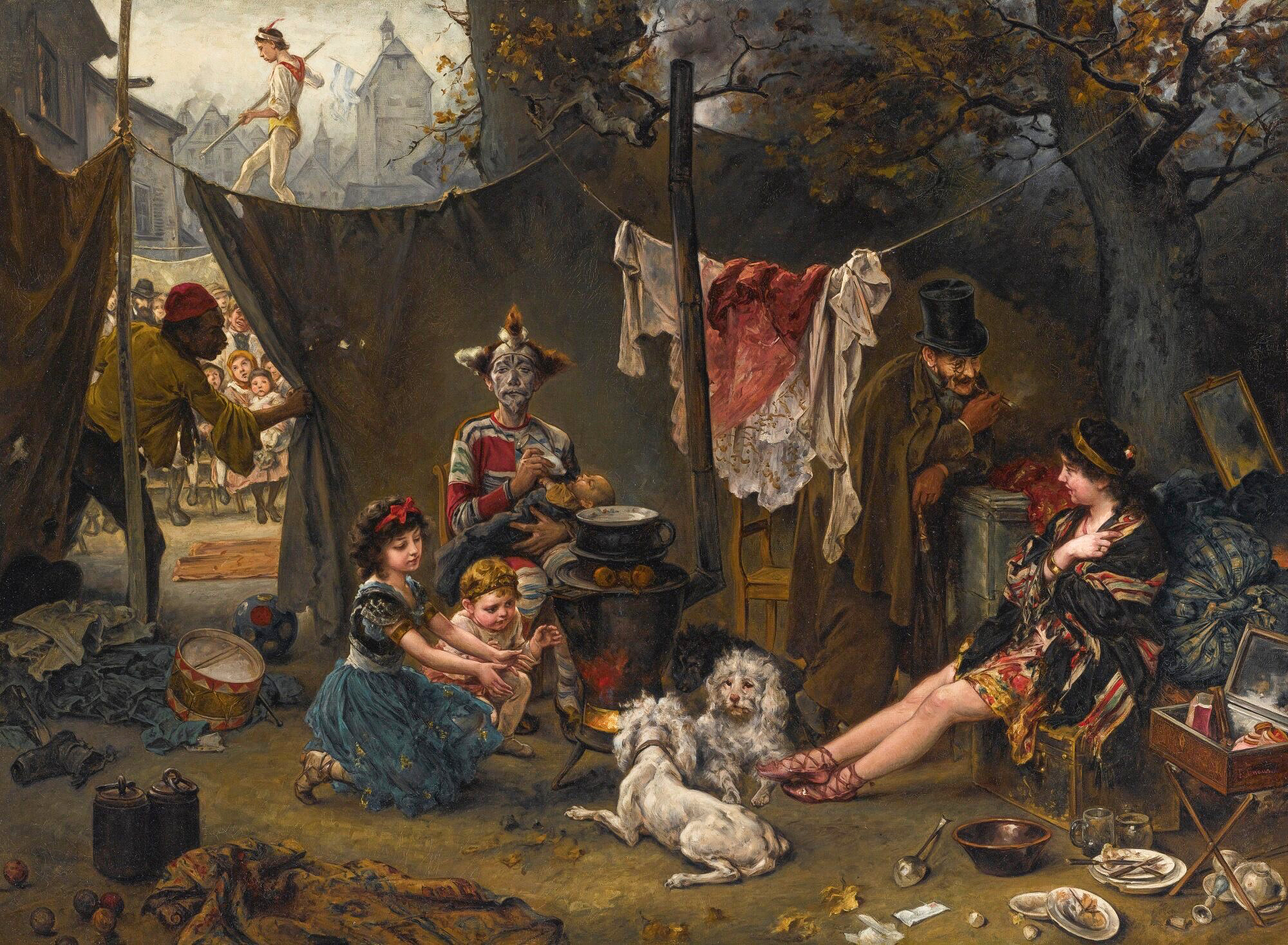
Ludwig Knaus, Behind the Scenes, 1880

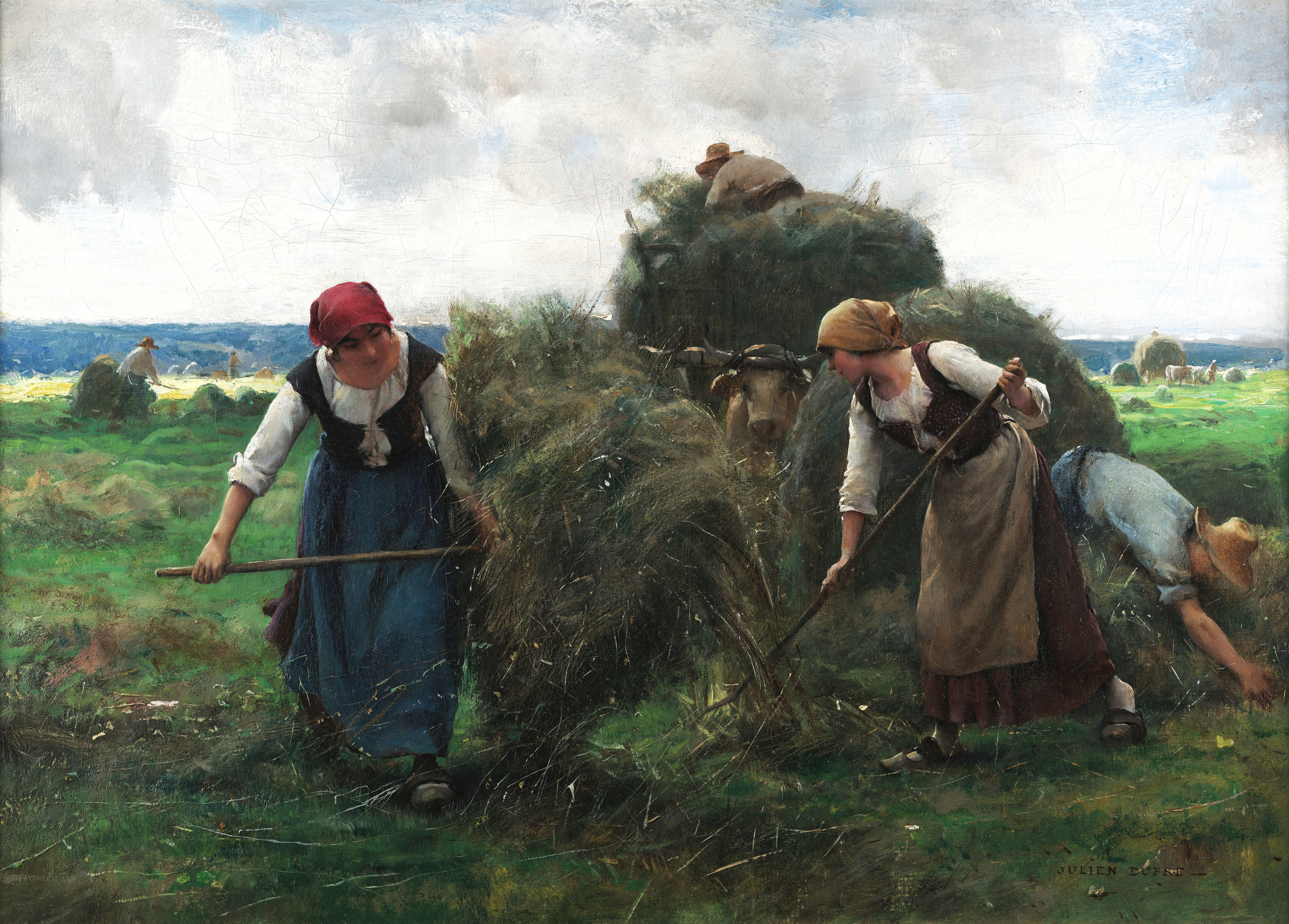
Julien Dupré, The Hay Harvesters, c. 1880

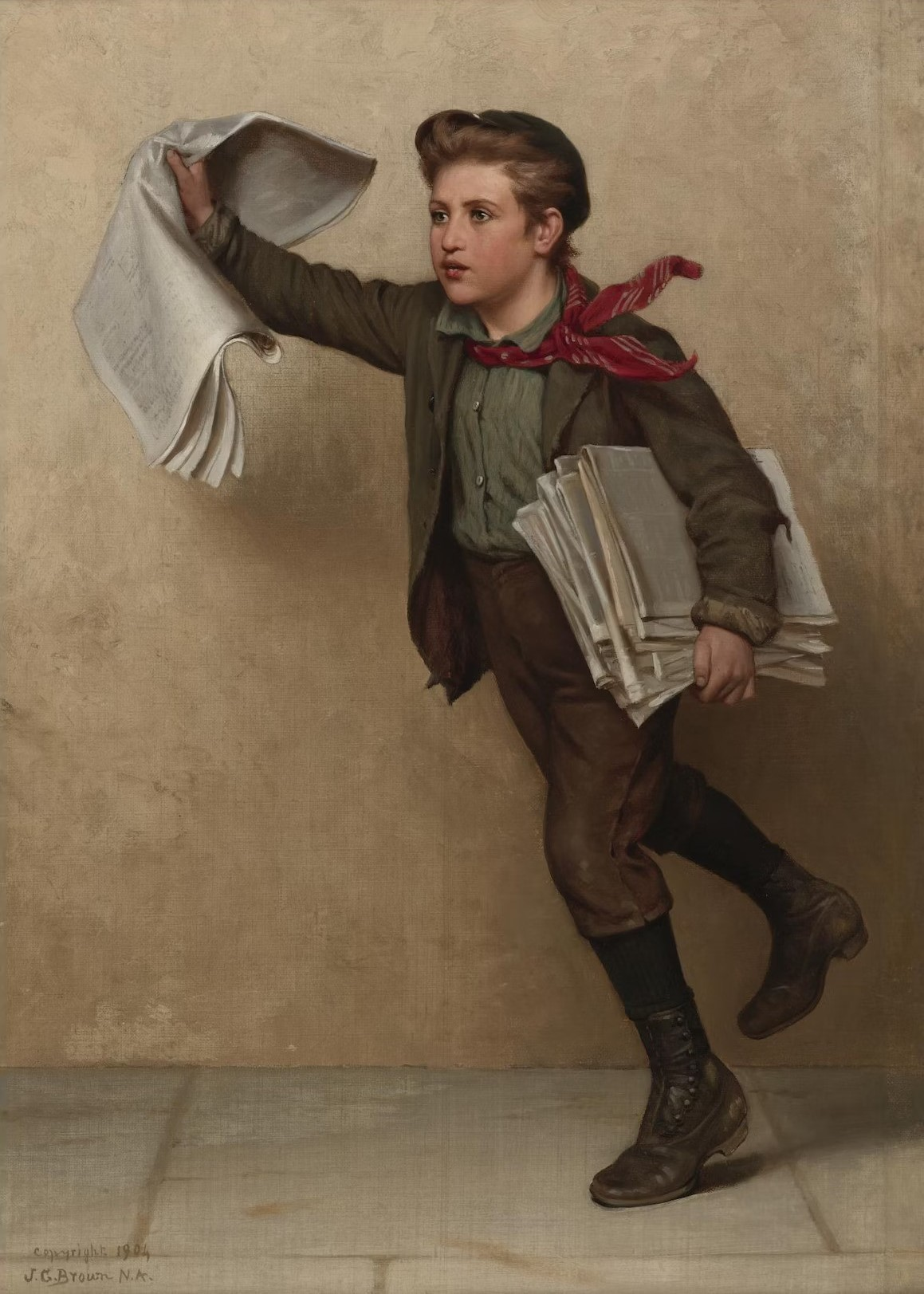
John George Brown, Extra, Extra (The Paper Boy), 1904

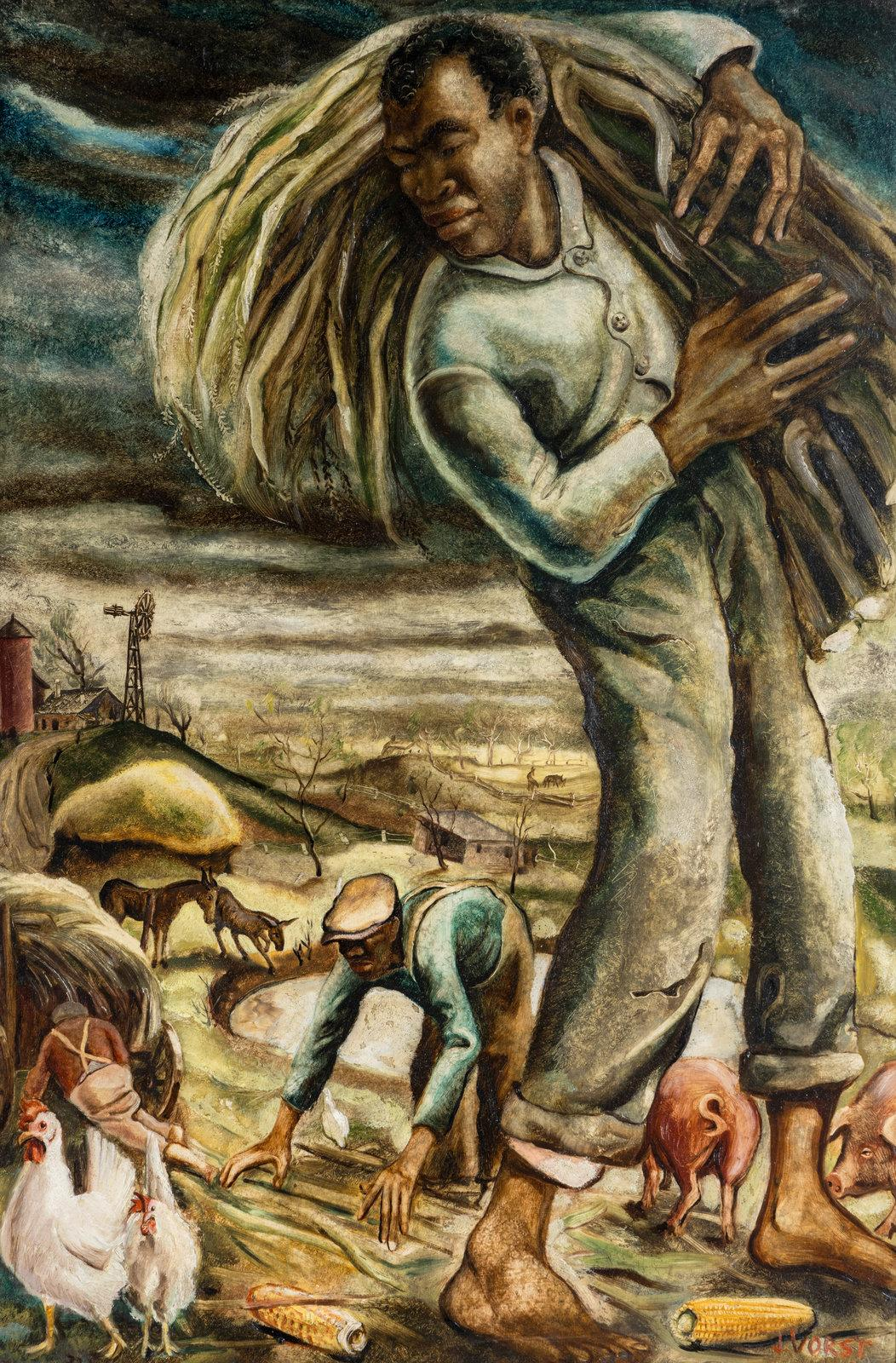
Joseph Paul Vorst, Farm Workers, c. 1938

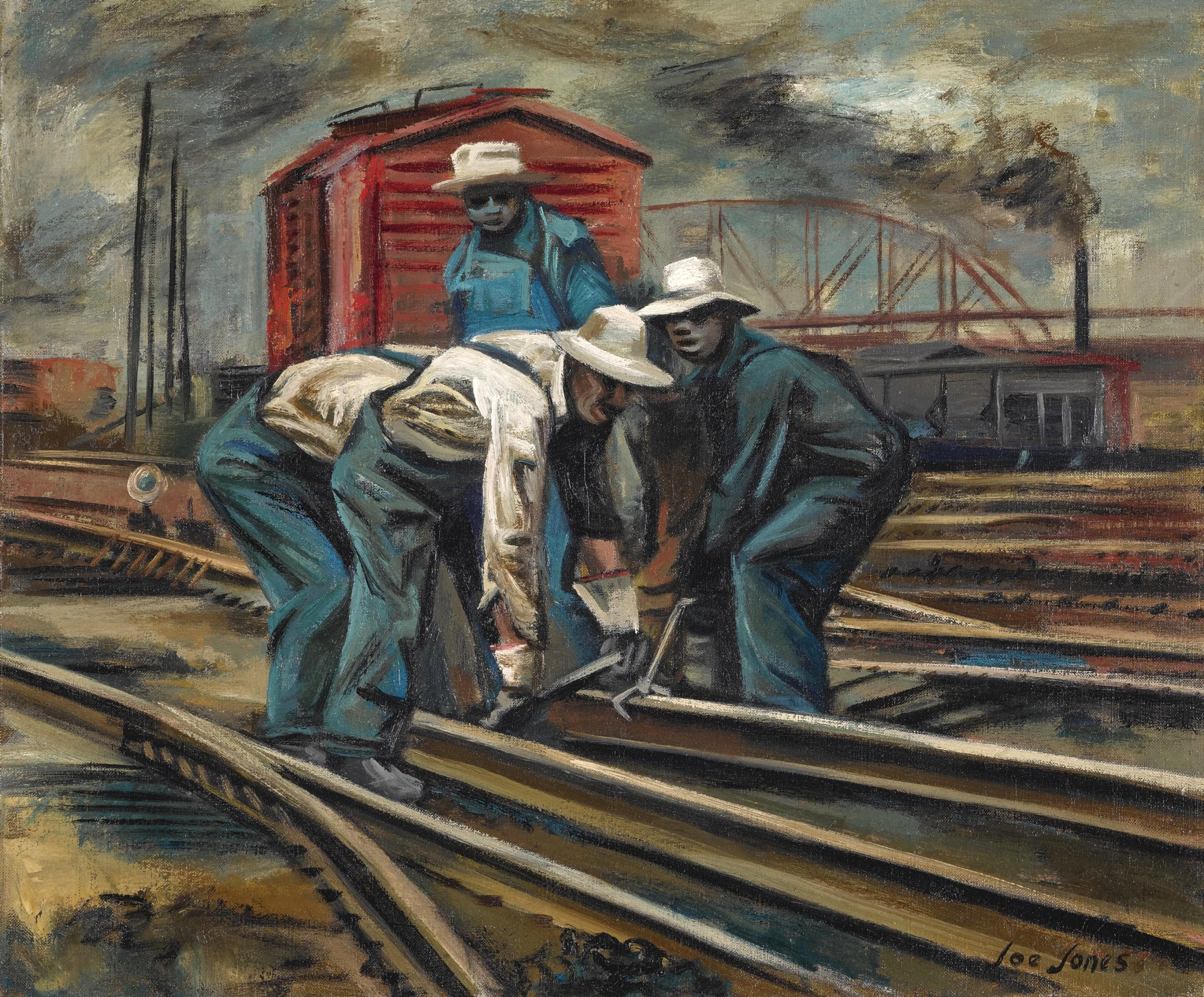
Joe Jones, Railroad Workers, St. Louis, 1940

== Exhibitions ==
The inaugural special exhibition Physicians, Quacks, and Alchemists, showed 17th century medical paintings and ran from October 27, 2007 to April 14, 2008. Since then, the museum has hosted over 60 temporary exhibitions.

List of Grohmann Museum Exhibitions
- Stone April 18, 2008 – July 14, 2008
- A Focus on Figures July 25, 2008 – October 4, 2008
- American Steel: Works from the Collection of Tom and Lorie Annarella October 17, 2008 – January 4, 2009
- Cradle of Industry: Works from the Rhineland Industrial Museum January 16 – April 5, 2009
- Wisconsin at Work: Thorsten Lindberg Paintings and Drawings from the MCHS Collection April 17 – August 14, 2009
- The Bookworm by Carl Spitzweg (1808-1885) May 15 – October 4, 2009
- Midwest Murals: Joe Jones and J.B. Turnbull from the Haggerty Museum of Art, Marquette University September 4 – December 6, 2009
- Foundry Work: A View of the Industry, The Photographs of Michael Schultz January 15 – April 5, 2010
- Working Wisconsin: Selections from the Museum of Wisconsin Art April 16 – August 20, 2010
- Wonders of Work and Labor: The Steidle Collection of American Industrial Art, Penn State University September 18, 2010 – January 3, 2011
- Lake Boats: The Photography of Jim Brozek and Christopher Winters January 14 – April 3, 2011
- Milwaukee Mills: A Visual History April 15 – August 21, 2011
- Requiem for Steam: The Railroad Photographs of David Plowden September 23 – December 11, 2011
- Working Legacies: The Death and (After)Life of Post-Industrial Milwaukee December 16, 2011 – February 6, 2012
- H. D. Tylle: Touring Germany and Working in Wisconsin February 17 – April 22, 2012
- Great Lakers: Selections from the Great Lakes Marine Collection of the Milwaukee Public Library May 11 – August 6, 2012
- Carl Spitzweg: The Poor Poet and Other Characters August 20 – December 30, 2012
- MSOE at Work: Selections from the Campus Archives September 7 – December 17, 2012
- Bridges: The Spans of North America - Photographs by David Plowden January 18 – April 28, 2013
- Born of Fire: Scenes of Industry from the Westmoreland Museum of American Art May 24 – August 18, 2013
- A Working Ranch by Jim Brozek September 6 – December 13, 2013
- Trains that Passed in the Night: Railroad Photographs of O Winston Link January 17 – April 27, 2014
- Art Shay: Working May 16 – August 17, 2014
- Erich Mercker: Painter of Industry September 5 – December 14, 2014
- The Art of the Milwaukee Road January 16 – April 26, 2015
- Carl Spitzweg in Milwaukee April 9 – September 13, 2015
- H.D. Tylle: Studies April 17 – June 28, 2015
- Metal for Mettle: Historic Commemorative Medals Honoring Labor and Achievement May 15 – August 23, 2015
- Forge Work: New Photography by Michael Schultz September 4 – December 13, 2015
- Art of the North Shore Line January 22 – April 24, 2016
- Milwaukee's Industrial Landscapes: Paintings by Michael Newhall May 27 – August 21, 2016
- On the Job: Photography by Jim Seder September 9 – December 11, 2016
- STEEL: The Cycle of Industry by David Plowden January 20 – April 30, 2017
- Artists at Work: The Cedarburg Artists Guild May 19 – August 20, 2017
- Masterworks from the Grohmann Museum - Celebrating 10 Years September 8 – December 29, 2017
- The Art and Mechanics of Animation January 19 – April 29, 2018
- Wallace W. Abbey: A Life in Railroad Photography May 11 – August 19, 2018
- David Plowden's Portraits of Work September 7 – December 30, 2018
- Growing Place: A Visual Study of Urban Farming January 18 – April 28, 2019
- Roll Up Your Sleeves May 17 – August 18, 2019
- The Magnificent Machines of Milwaukee September 6, 2019 – January 26, 2020
- IRONBOAT: New Photography by Christopher Winters January 17 – August 7, 2020
- TWO EDMUNDS: Fitzgerald and Lewandowski—Their Mark on Milwaukee September 10 – December 29, 2020
- Electric Steel: Recent Photographs by Michael Schultz January 15 – April 25, 2021
- artWORK by the League of Milwaukee Artists May 21 – August 22, 2021
- The Railroad and the Art of Place: Photographs by David Kahler September 10 – December 19, 2021
- Robert O. Lahmann: Working in Wisconsin January 21 – April 24, 2022
- Familias Unidas: Tribute to the Migrant Farm Worker Labor Movement in Wisconsin, 1960s-70 April 22 – August 21, 2022
- A Time of Toil and Triumph: Selections from the Shogren-Meyer Collection of American Art September 9, 2022 – February 26, 2023
- David Plowden: The Architecture of Agriculture April 21, 2023 – August 20, 2023
- Excavations: Paintings and Drawings by Michael Newhall October 20, 2023 – December 17, 2023
- Mining Gems: Stories from the Collection September 8, 2023 – January 21, 2024
- H.D. Tylle at Seventy: American Worklife March 22 – May 26, 2024
- Patterns of Meaning: The Art of Industry by Cory Bonnet Jan. 19 – June 16, 2024
- Crossing the DMZ: A Contemporary Look at Working Women May 9 – August 25, 2024
- Gil Reid and Friends: Working on the Railroad September 6 - December 22, 2024
- On the Edge: The Labor and Environment of Dimensional Stone Quarries January 17 - April 27, 2025
- Going to Work for the Community: A Visual History of the Beckum-Stapleton Little League April 11 - May 25, 2025
- The Kalmbach Art Collection: Pairing Words and Imagery May 16 - August 18, 2025
- The Legend Lives On - 50 Years Later October 1 - December 1, 2025
- Dave Clay's Industrial Atmospheres January 16 - April 26, 2026
- WE THE PEOPLE: Portraits of Veterans in America May 7 - August 23, 2026
- Boots and Sand: The Marines of 29 Palms May 7 - August 23, 2026
- "One Step Ahead of the Wrecking Ball: The Best of David Plowden from the Grohmann Museum Collection" July 8 - November 30, 2026
- Lina Bertucci: Railroad Voices—The Milwaukee Road, 1974–1977 September 4 - December 20, 2026

== Bibliography ==
- Türk, Klaus (2009). Sculptures of Workers: Figures from the Grohmann Museum. Milwaukee, WI: MSOE Press. ISBN 978-0980093346.
- Türk, Klaus (2014). Masterworks from the Grohmann Museum. Milwaukee, WI: MSOE Press. ISBN 978-0972804431.
- Türk, Klaus (2015). Carl Spitzweg in Milwaukee: Paintings from the Milwaukee Art Museum, the Eckhart G. Grohmann Collection, and the Grohmann Museum. Milwaukee, WI: MSOE Press. ISBN 978-0972804462.
