= Morgridge College of Education =

- Type: Private
- Established: 1890
- Dean: Bruce Uhrmacher
- Postgraduates: 808
- Location: 1999 E Evans Avenue, Denver, Colorado; 39°40′44″N 104°57′52″W
- Campus: Urban, University of Denver
- Nicknames: Morgridge, College of Ed, MCE
- Website: morgridge.du.edu

The Morgridge College of Education at the University of Denver offers graduate and doctoral degrees in the fields of educational leadership, higher education, research methods information science, teaching and learning sciences, and counseling psychology. It is named after the Morgridge Family Foundation, led by Carrie Morgridge, that donated $10 million to the college.

The Morgridge College of Education is located on the University of Denver's main campus in Denver's University Hill neighborhood. The school currently educates more than 1000 students with 60 full-time faculty, including 63% who are tenured or on a tenure track. It is also home to two clinics open to the public for educational assessment and counseling services, two model schools on the University of Denver campus, and three research institutes; Marsico Institute for Early Learning and Literacy, the Center for Rural School Health & Education (CRSHE), and the Positive Early Learning Center (PELE).

Graduate programs in MCE are accredited by many governing bodies, including the National Council for Accreditation of Teacher Education and American Psychological Association.

== History ==
The College of Education dates back to the 1890s with teacher education as the first focus. The first teacher education certificates were offered in 1898 to professional men and woman. Teacher preparation and Educational Leadership remains a staple of the College of Education today.

Throughout the early 20th century the education program continued to grow with the first master's degree offered in 1901 and the first doctorate in 1935. The School of Education was organized in 1945 and became a college of the University of Denver in the mid-1980s. The College of Education added an Educational Specialist (Ed.S.) degree in School Psychology in the mid-1990s. The college continued to expand, acquiring the Library and Information Management program in 2000 and offering a Master of Library and Information Science (MLIS)

In 2008, the College of Education became one of the few named colleges of education in the country, becoming the Morgridge College of education after the Morgridge Family. The Morgridge College of Education received a new home in 2011 at the corner of Evan St. and High St. on the west side of the University of Denver campus. The new building houses state of the art technology including SmartBoard or Promethean Boards in all classrooms, collaborative work stations throughout the building, a centralized control room, and Crestron control panels in all classrooms.

== Programs ==
The Morgridge College of Education trains graduate students for master's, graduate, and doctoral degrees in 10 distinct programs. The Morgridge College of Education offers 7 online programs, including an online Master of Library and Information Science degree program. The college offers a number of specialized certificates.

It also offers a dual-degree program in teaching. Students begin as undergraduates at the University of Denver and apply to the College of Education as juniors. During a student's senior year, they begin taking masters-level courses. Students complete masters coursework and requirements during the year following their bachelors graduation. Upon completion of the dual-degree, students will be licensed teachers and hold a master's degree.

The Morgridge College of Education offers over $14 million in financial aid to its students each year, providing aid or tuition discounts to 100% of admitted students. Aid is offered through a variety of avenues and individual programs may have additional funds for their students. In addition, the University of Denver has need-based aid available for students who qualify through the FAFSA form.

== Rankings ==
The Morgridge College of Education was ranked #85 in Best Education Schools by U.S. News & World Report (2022). In Education School Specialty rankings, they were ranked #21 for Educational Supervision and Administration (2022).

== See also ==
- Carrie Morgridge
