= Carrie Morgridge =

American philanthropist and author (born 1967)

- Born: 1967 (age 58–59); Santa Barbara, California, U.S.
- Occupations: Philanthropist, author
- Years active: 15+
- Website: morgridgefamilyfoundation.org

Carrie Morgridge (born 1967) is an American philanthropist and author. She is CEO and Co-Founder of the Morgridge Family Foundation, funded by an annual grant from John P. and Tashia Morgridge's TOSA Foundation. The foundation's contributions have been in the hundreds of millions of dollars, with a particular focus on improving education, as well as health, the arts and the environment. Her book Every Gift Matters advocated the idea that even small gifts can have a big impact if done properly.

== Early life ==
Morgridge grew up in a low-income family in Santa Barbara, California. She worked at a grocery store and learned to "pinch pennies," as her family was living "paycheck-to-paycheck". She graduated summa cum laude from the International Academy of Design and Technology. Her first marriage ended quickly; she was married and divorced by age 21. She owned and sold a chain of tanning salons in California and has been described by the Denver Post as a "savvy businesswoman". In addition, she finished eleven Ironman Triathlon competitions. In 1991 she married John Morgridge, the son of Cisco Systems former CEO John Morgridge.

== Morgridge Family Foundation ==
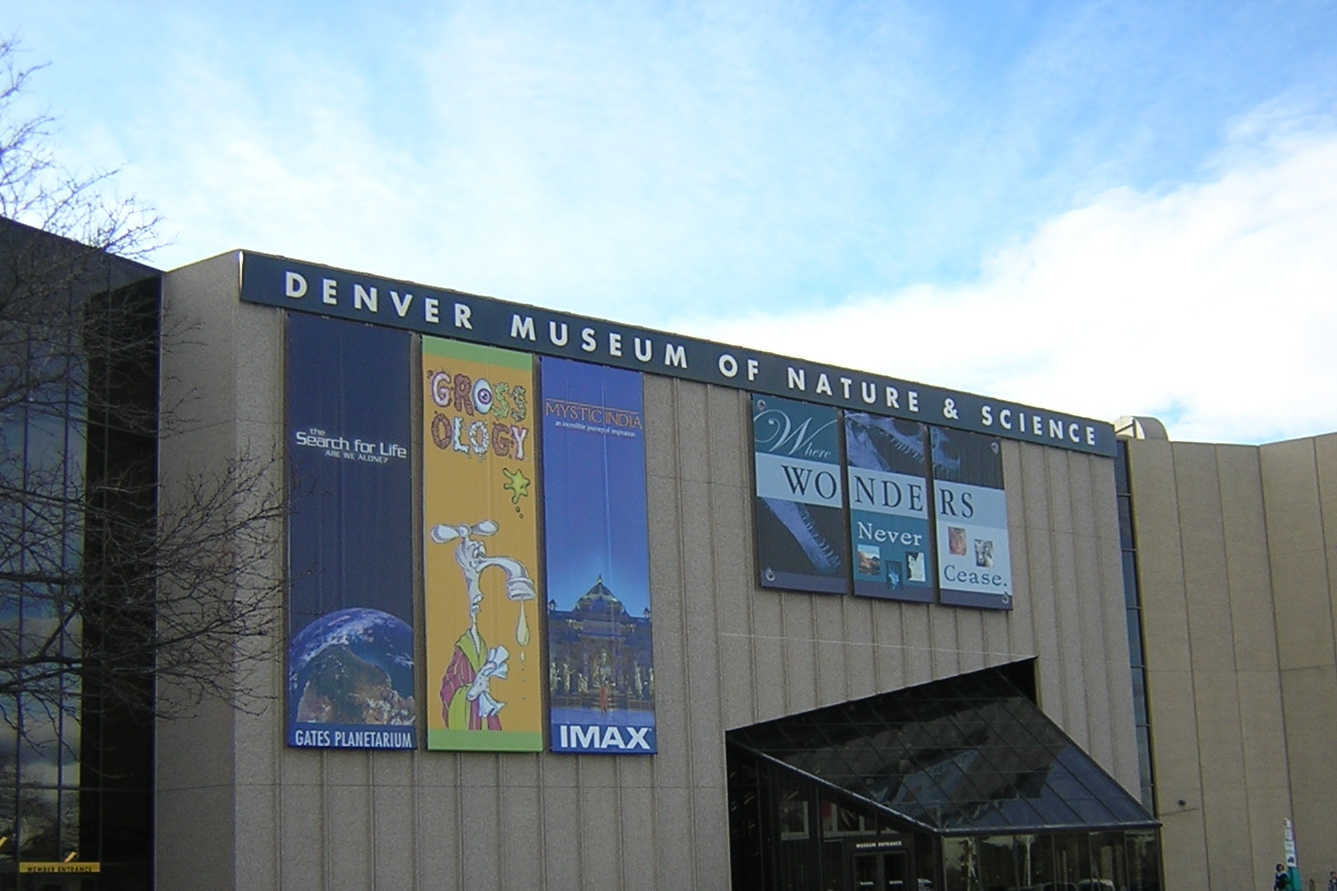
Morgridge Family Foundation gave $8 million to the Denver Museum of Nature and Science.

Morgridge learned the basics of philanthropy while working at the Aspen Valley Foundation, the Aspen Institute, and the Aspen Santa Fe Ballet. She and her husband founded the nonprofit Morgridge Family Foundation in 2008. The foundation is funded by an annual grant from John P. and Tashia Morgridge's TOSA Foundation, established by Morgridge's parents-in-law.

While the Morgridge Family Foundation contributes to 185 projects per year, a few of them are what Morgridge calls "mega-gifts". For example, the foundation contributed $15 million to National Jewish Health, a Denver-based medical research facility. In appreciation of that gift in 2013, National Jewish Health established the Morgridge Educational Campus, which includes the Morgridge Academy for chronically ill children, and the Morgridge Fellowship Program. The foundation gave $4 million to the Mile High United Way Morgridge Center for Community Change. The foundation also gave $10 million to the University of Denver to establish the Morgridge College of Education. It donated $8 million to Denver Museum of Nature and Science, which was described in the Denver Post as being the largest bequest in the museum's 109-year history. It gave $3.5 million to create the Denver School of Science and Technology. A major project the foundation has sponsored is "Share Fair Nation" which trains teachers to use new classroom technologies such as whiteboards, and which brings teachers together so they can share their teaching strategies. The foundation donated substantially to Colorado Mountain College.

In June 2022, the Morgridge Family Foundation made a significant contribution of $3 million to the Colorado State University College of Agricultural Sciences, specifically designated for use at the CSU spur campus located in Denver. In September of the same year, the foundation donated another $3 million towards the construction and establishment of the Morgridge Strength and Performance Lab at Plymouth State University. This facility, with a total project cost of $4 million, was officially inaugurated to provide resources and research opportunities in the field of strength and performance.

In November 2022, the Morgridge Family Foundation, launched the Child Welfare Initiative, a $1.4 million program focusing on advancing research and professional training in the U.S. child welfare sector. With a focus on preserving familial units, the initiative is collaborating with relevant organizations and experts, and is funding both the Colorado Research & Implementation Science Team and nationwide training accelerators developed with social-design firm MindSpark. The project addresses potential shortcomings in the current child welfare system, including its potential adverse impacts on education and mental health.

== Author ==
Morgridge claims that one of the hardest tasks of being a philanthropist is rejecting requests. She believes in teaching students to be generous, creating youth philanthropy clubs, and was quoted as saying that "small gifts, given properly, do matter." This was a prominent idea in her book Every Gift Matters. According to The New York Times, the foundation typically gives gifts to major programs that last only three years. As a philanthropist, she likes to meet beneficiaries in person. She prefers to contribute to projects which involve "something new", such as interactive classroom whiteboards and laptops and other technologies for the classroom.

As I got to know Carrie, I realized just how passionate she is about education, and just how much she and the foundation have done for a large variety of educational programs.

— Jane Goodall, primatologist, 2015

Morgridge was a recipient of Urban Legend Award (2015); Frances Wisebart Jacobs award (2010); Urban Peak (2015); Hope Award (2015); and Josef Korbel Humanitarian Award (2016). and the National Jewish Health Arthur B. Lorber Award for Distinguished Service, the institution's highest honor.

In June 2023, she was awarded an honorary Doctorate of Education by the University of Denver and served as the graduate commencement ceremony speaker for that year.

Morgridge and her husband have two children. She lives in Florida and Colorado.
