= Peter Engelmann =

German American educationist

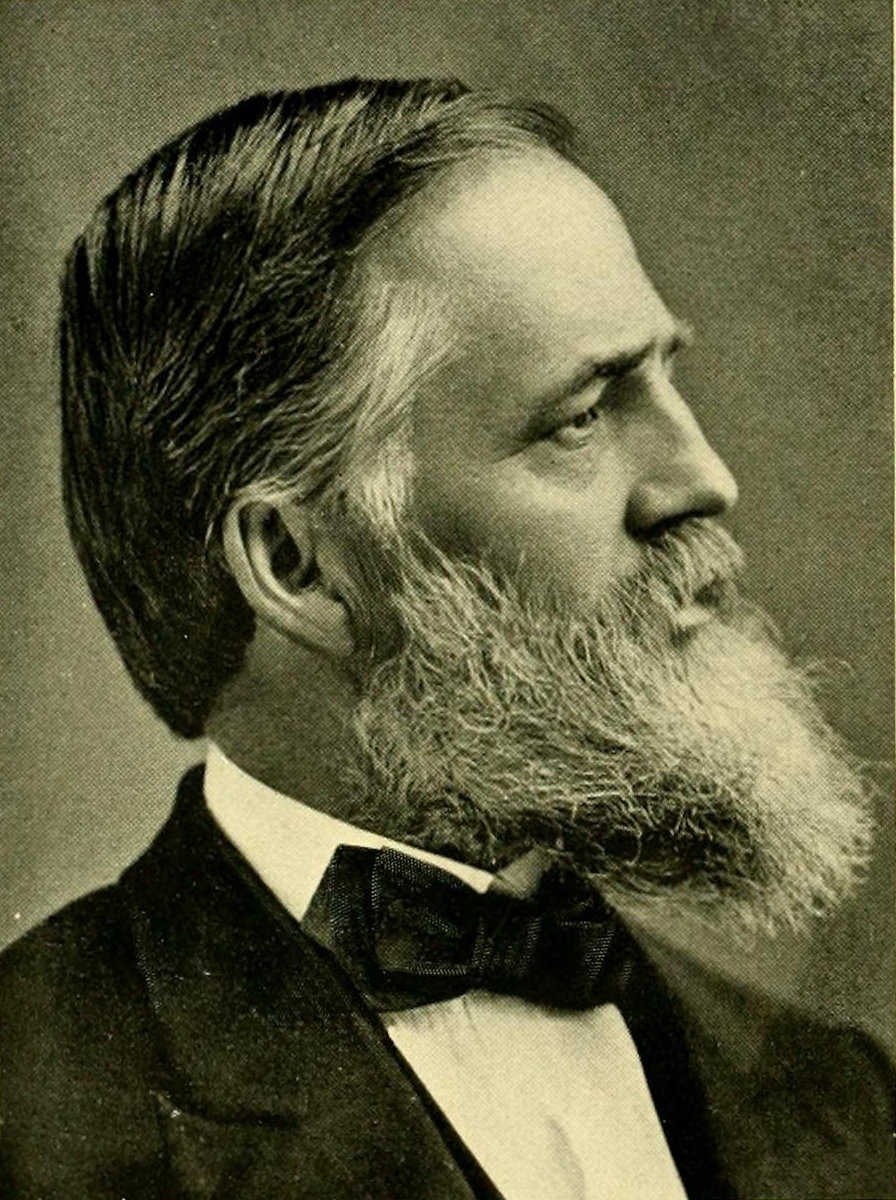
- From History of Milwaukee from its first settlement to the year 1895 (1895)
- Born: January 24, 1823; Argenthal, Rhine Province, Kingdom of Prussia
- Died: May 17, 1874 (aged 51); Milwaukee, Wisconsin, U.S.
- Known for: Founded the Milwaukee Public Museum and the "German-English Academy" of Milwaukee
- Spouse: Jane Young (m. 1849; died 1856)

Peter Engelmann (January 24, 1823 – May 17, 1874) was a German American immigrant, educationist, writer, and Wisconsin pioneer. He was the founder of the collection which became the Milwaukee Public Museum, and was also founder of the influential "German-English Academy" of Milwaukee, Wisconsin, which lives on as part of the University School of Milwaukee.

== Early life and flight from Germany ==
Peter Engelmann was born on January 24, 1823, in Argenthal, in the Rhine Province of the Kingdom of Prussia. He studied at the University of Heidelberg and at the Humboldt University of Berlin. He received his teaching license in 1846, and began teaching at the Kreuznach Gymnasium that year.

At Bad Kreuznach, he became affiliated with the republican movement and founded the Kreuznacher Gymnastics and Civic Association, which led to his dismissal from teaching. He then became a writer and editor of a Prussian revolutionary newspaper, the Freier Demokrat (Free Democrat), in the midst of the German revolutions of 1848–1849.

After Prussia and the various German states crushed the effort to create a German Republic, Engelmann was threatened with jail for his revolutionary activities and decided to flee Germany. He emigrated to the United States—like many other German Forty-Eighters. He initially came to Marshall, Michigan, where he worked on a farm, but then made his way to Oshkosh, Wisconsin, and finally to Milwaukee.

== German-American Academy ==
In Milwaukee, he was quickly employed as a teacher for German American students, and he became deeply involved with the Milwaukee Schulverein—"school society". Through his efforts, they established the German-English Academy—with a charter from the Wisconsin Legislature—in May 1851. Engelmann was an active member of the Milwaukee Turners at Turner Hall and served as director of the German-English Academy from 1851 until his death, pioneering bilingual education, physical training, the arts, and establishing the city’s first kindergarten in 1873. Engelmann served as director of the academy for the rest of his life. The school was so closely associated with him, it was often referred to alternatively as the "Engelmann School".

The school gave instruction partly in English and partly in German, and pursued a well-rounded education including classes such as singing, gymnastics, and drawing. The school attempted to help students learn how to think for themselves, challenging students to observe and question. In 1873, Engelmann also established a kindergarten in his academy. This was the first kindergarten in Milwaukee and only the third in the country.

The school continued after his death. It later came to be known as the "Milwaukee University School" and, in 1964, it merged with other Milwaukee private schools to form the University School of Milwaukee.

== Milwaukee Public Museum ==
In 1857, Engelmann was also one of the founders of the Wisconsin Natural History Society ("Naturhistorichen Verein von Wisconsin"). The society accumulated a collection of specimens and manuscripts, referred to as the "Engelmann Museum". In 1882, the collection was turned over to the city of Milwaukee, which continued the exhibit as the Milwaukee Public Museum.

== Personal life and legacy ==
Engelmann married Jane Young in Michigan shortly after his arrival in America in 1849, but she died in 1856. They had no children.

He was also active in several organizations of freethinkers, wrote numerous articles, and lectured before liberal and scientific societies.

He died at his home in Milwaukee on the night of May 17, 1874, after a bout of Pneumonia.
