= University School of Milwaukee =

Private school in Milwaukee, Wisconsin, US

Location
- 2100 West Fairy Chasm Road; Milwaukee, Wisconsin; United States; 43°11′12″N 87°56′01″W

Information
- Other name: USM
- Former names: German-English Academy, Milwaukee University School, Milwaukee Country Day School, Milwaukee-Downer Seminary
- Type: Private, Day
- Motto: E Tribus Una (From Three, One)
- Established: 1964; 62 years ago
- CEEB code: 501390
- Head of school: Steve Hancock
- Enrollment: 1,107
- Average class size: 15
- Student to teacher ratio: 10:1
- Campus size: 123 acres (0.50 km^{2})
- Campus type: Suburban
- Colors: Blue and gold
- Athletics: 24 varsity sports
- Mascot: Willie the Wildcat
- Accreditation: Independent Schools Association of the Central States (ISACS)
- Affiliation: National Association of Independent Schools (NAIS)
- Website: www.usm.org

The University School of Milwaukee (often abbreviated to USM) is an independent pre-kindergarten through secondary preparatory school in River Hills and Milwaukee, Wisconsin. It was founded as the result of the merger of three schools: Milwaukee Country Day School, Milwaukee Downer Seminary, and Milwaukee University School. USM is accredited by the Independent Schools Association of the Central States and is a member of the National Association of Independent Schools (NAIS).

== History ==
Milwaukee University School, the oldest of the three schools that merged as University School of Milwaukee, was founded in 1851 as the German-English Academy (die deutsch-englische Akademie) by a group of Milwaukee German Americans that included educationist Peter Engelmann and hardware wholesaler William Frankfurth. The Academy offered classes that taught the German language and literature, as well as English. In 1891, the academy moved to the German-English Academy Building in downtown Milwaukee. The institution changed its name in 1917 to Milwaukee University School because of anti-German prejudice that occurred during World War I.

In 1964, the Milwaukee University School, the Milwaukee Country Day School and Milwaukee-Downer Seminary merged to become the University School of Milwaukee. It operated from two campuses, North and South, one in Whitefish Bay and the other in River Hills. In 1985, the two combined into one campus at the River Hills location, serving students from pre-kindergarten through twelfth grade.

In 2022, Craig and Kelly Robinson filed a civil lawsuit alleging retaliation and discrimination by the school after they raised concerns about its treatment of students of color. The school denied the allegations and the lawsuit was dismissed with prejudice in 2024.

== Athletics ==
The school's athletic teams follow a no-cut athletic policy, which allows every student to participate in any sport. The athletic program begins in fifth grade when students become eligible for a number of teams, including basketball, track and field, football, and several intramural sports. The Middle School offers 13 interscholastic sports and intramural options. The Upper School has 24 varsity teams level sports, in addition to a number of junior varsity programs.

| Sports | State championships | Conference championships |
|---|---|---|
| Baseball | 2010 | 5× champions |
| Basketball (B/G) | | Boys' basketball: 6× champions Girls' basketball: 2× champions |
| Cross country (B/G) | Girls' Cross Country: 2024 | Boys' cross country: 10× champions Girls' cross country: 2× champions |
| Field hockey | 2014, 2011, 2010, 2009, 2005, 2003, 2002, 2001, 1991 | 12× champions |
| Football | | 10× champions |
| Golf | | 8× champions |
| Ice hockey (B/G) | Boys' ice hockey: 2019, 2010, 2006, Girls' ice hockey: 2015 | Boys' ice hockey: 8× champions Girls' ice hockey: 3× champions |
| Lacrosse (B/G) | Girls' lacrosse: 2021 | Boys' lacrosse: 3× champions Girls' lacrosse 1× champion |
| Skiing (coed) | | |
| Soccer (B/G) | Boys' soccer: 2018, 2013 Girls' soccer: 2008 | Boys' soccer: 20× champions Girls' soccer: 9× champions |
| Softball | | |
| Swimming (B/G) | | 1× champion |
| Tennis (B/G) | Boys': 2018, 2015, 2014, 2013, 2011, 2010, 2009, 2008, 2007, 2006, 2004 Girls': 2023, 2022, 2018, 2017, 2014, 2012, 2011, 2007, 2006, 2005, 2004 | Boys': 46× champions Girls': 14× champions |
| Track and field (B/G) | | Boys' track: 13× champions Girls' track: 6× champions |
| Volleyball | | 2× champions |

=== Athletic conference affiliation history ===
==== Milwaukee Country Day School ====
- Wisconsin Prep Conference (1940-1952)
- Midwest Prep Conference (1952-1964)

==== Milwaukee University School ====
- Wisconsin Prep Conference (1940-1952)
- Midwest Prep Conference (1952-1964)

==== University School of Milwaukee ====
- Midwest Prep Conference (1964-1983)
- Midwest Classic Conference (1983–present)

== Notable alumni ==
- Rakesh "Raj" Bhala, international trade law and Islamic law expert and professor at the University of Kansas
- Raj Chetty, professor of economics at Harvard University
- Adam Ciralsky, journalist, television and film producer, and attorney
- James Graaskamp, professor of real estate analysis and appraisal
- Carl Holty, painter
- Bob Jake, basketball player and physician
- William Kasik, businessman and member of the Wisconsin State Assembly
- Robert Koehler, artist and teacher
- Von Mansfield, football player
- Lane MacDonald, hockey player
- Sue Mingus, record producer and band manager
- George Rathmann, chemist and biotechnology executive, (co-founder of Amgen)
- Henry Reuss, member of Congress
- Mark Rylance, Academy Award winner for best supporting actor; stage director
- Wendy Selig-Prieb, businesswoman, former president of the Milwaukee Brewers
- James Sensenbrenner, member of Congress
- Erich C. Stern, lawyer and Wisconsin State Representative
- Brooks Stevens, industrial designer
- August Uihlein, brewer and later owner of the Joseph Schlitz Brewing Company
- Neal Ulevich, photojournalist, Pulitzer Prize winner
- August H. Vogel, vice-president and the general manager of Pfister & Vogel
- D.A. Wallach, musician and business executive
- William Morton Wheeler, myrmecologist
- Sarah P. L. Wolffe, Lady Wolffe, Outer House Senator of the College of Justice of Scotland
- Bill Zito, general manager of the Florida Panthers
