= Silver Dolphin Books =

Publisher of activity, novelty, and education books for preschoolers to 12-year-olds

- Parent company: Readerlink Distribution Services
- Founded: 1990; 35 years ago
- Country of origin: United States
- Headquarters location: San Diego, California
- Distribution: Publishers Group West
- Publication types: Children's books
- Official website: silverdolphinbooks.com

Silver Dolphin Books is an American publisher of activity, novelty, and educational nonfiction books for preschoolers to 12-year-olds.

Silver Dolphin Books are distributed by Publishers Group West. They are an imprint of Printers Row Publishing Group, whose other imprints are Thunder Bay Press, Portable Press, and Canterbury Classics.

== History ==
Silver Dolphin was founded by the book distributor Advanced Marketing Services. Advanced Marketing Services was acquired by Baker & Taylor in 2007. Readerlink Distribution Services acquired Silver Dolphin from Baker & Taylor in 2015.
