= Washington Monument (Milwaukee) =

Public artwork by Richard Henry Park

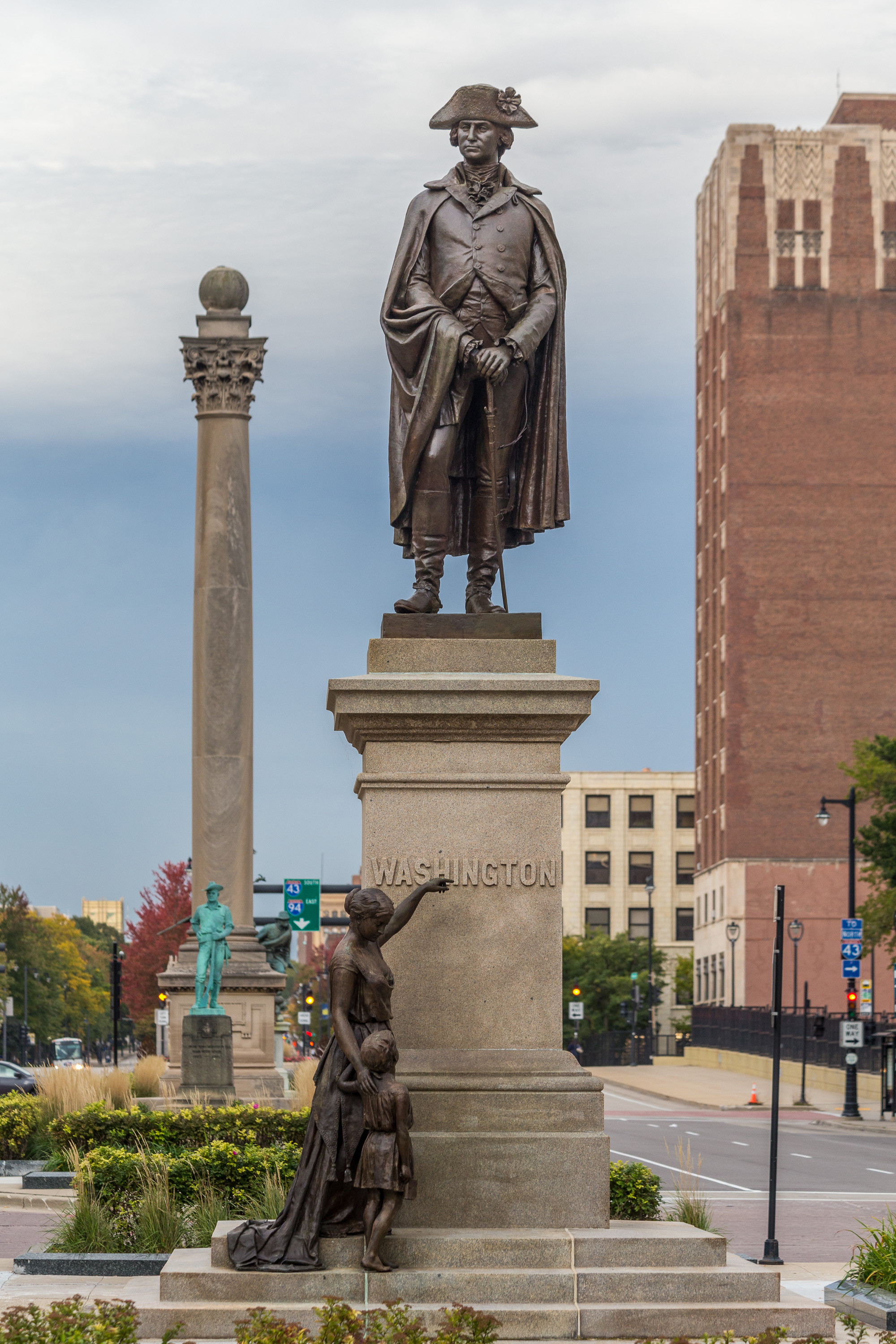
- Artist: Richard Henry Park
- Year: 1885
- Type: bronze sculpture
- Dimensions: 280 cm × 100 cm × 100 cm (110 in × 41 in × 41 in)
- Location: Wisconsin Ave. near 8th St. in front of MPL Central, Milwaukee; 43°2′19.643″N 87°55′22.266″W

The Washington Monument is a public artwork by American artist Richard Henry Park located on the Court of Honor in front of the Milwaukee Public Library Central Library, which is near Marquette University in Milwaukee, Wisconsin. The bronze sculpture is a full-length portrait of a 43-year-old George Washington, and stands on a granite pedestal; a bronze woman points up at Washington while a child, also made out of bronze, gazes upward. It was sculpted by Richard Henry Park and was erected in 1885 with philanthropic financial support from Elizabeth Plankinton. The statue was restored between July 2016 and January 2018.

== Description ==
The 10 foot and 6 inch high full-length sculpture depicts George Washington at the age of 43. "He wears a hat with flower, cape, boots, jacket, vest and pants. He holds a sword with both hands in front of him." There are two bronze figures at the foot of the base that were added at the suggestion of Miss Elizabeth Plankinton. One, a woman, points up to the statue with her proper left arm, while the second figure, a child, gazes upward while holding an open book at his side. The inscription on the lower left side of the sculpture reads "RH PARK SC". The inscription on the proper right lower side of the sculpture reads "F. GALLI FUSERO". The front of the base reads "WASHINGTON". The back of the base reads "The Gift of / Elizabeth A. Plankinton / To the City of Milwaukee / 1885".

== Background ==
Richard Henry Park's George Washington, dedicated on November 7, 1885, was the first public monument in Milwaukee. It was given to the city as a gift by Elizabeth Plankinton, popularly known as Miss Lizzie, as a gesture of her love for Milwaukee. "It would also ensure, as one of the speakers noted at the dedication of the statue, that 'during the coming generations when other men shall walk these streets, this monument will stand a text for the old and a lesson for the young.' Because this was to be the city's first public statue, it seemed fitting that the nation's first president, George Washington, be its subject." The 43-year-old Washington is depicted wearing an exact copy of the Commander-in-Chief uniform of the Continental Army.

The sculpture cost about $20,000. Thousands of people attended its unveiling, although Miss Lizzie did not. it was placed on the boulevard on W. Wisconsin Avenue, one of the city's earliest parks. This location later became known as the Court of Honor because of the crowning of Rex, King of the Milwaukee Midsummer Carnival Festival, which took place in the same area. Every year on Washington's birthday the Military Order of the Purple Heart places a wreath on the monument to honor its founder.

Short video of Washington Monument in Milwaukee.

== Artist ==
Artist Richard Henry Park was born on a farm in Connecticut in 1832. Park was inspired to become a sculptor after attending a Hiram Powers exhibition. He worked as a marble cutter's apprentice, producing marble copies of Erastus Dow Palmer's work. The sculptor moved to Florence in 1871 where he met Thomas Hardy, yet he remained a very popular artist with Milwaukee's elite. He became acquainted with Elizabeth Plankinton while making a sculpture of her father and they became engaged, but he ended up marrying a different woman. Park is also known for sculpting a silver statue of Justice for Montana's exhibit at the World's Columbian Exposition in 1893 in Chicago.

== Restoration ==
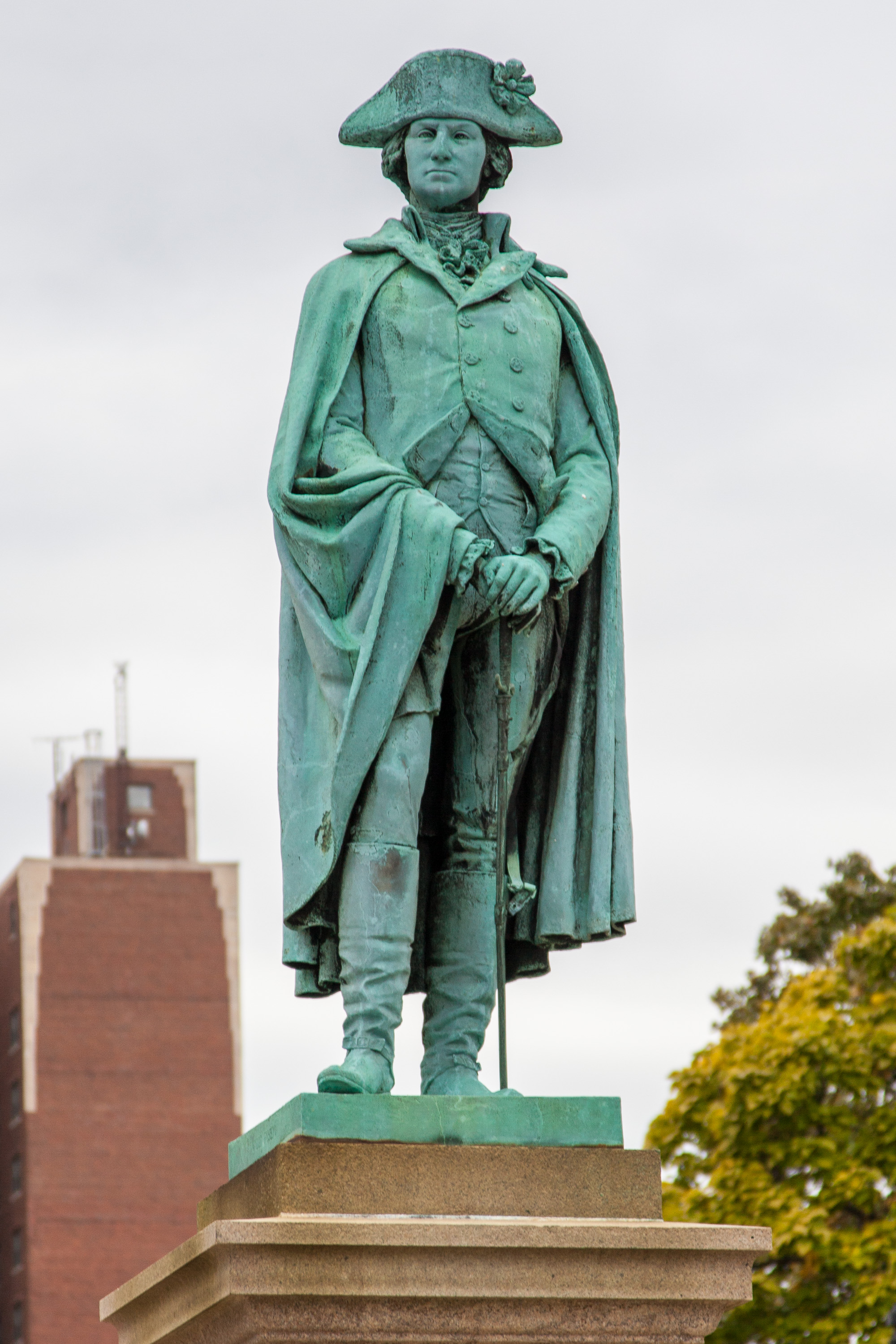
2012

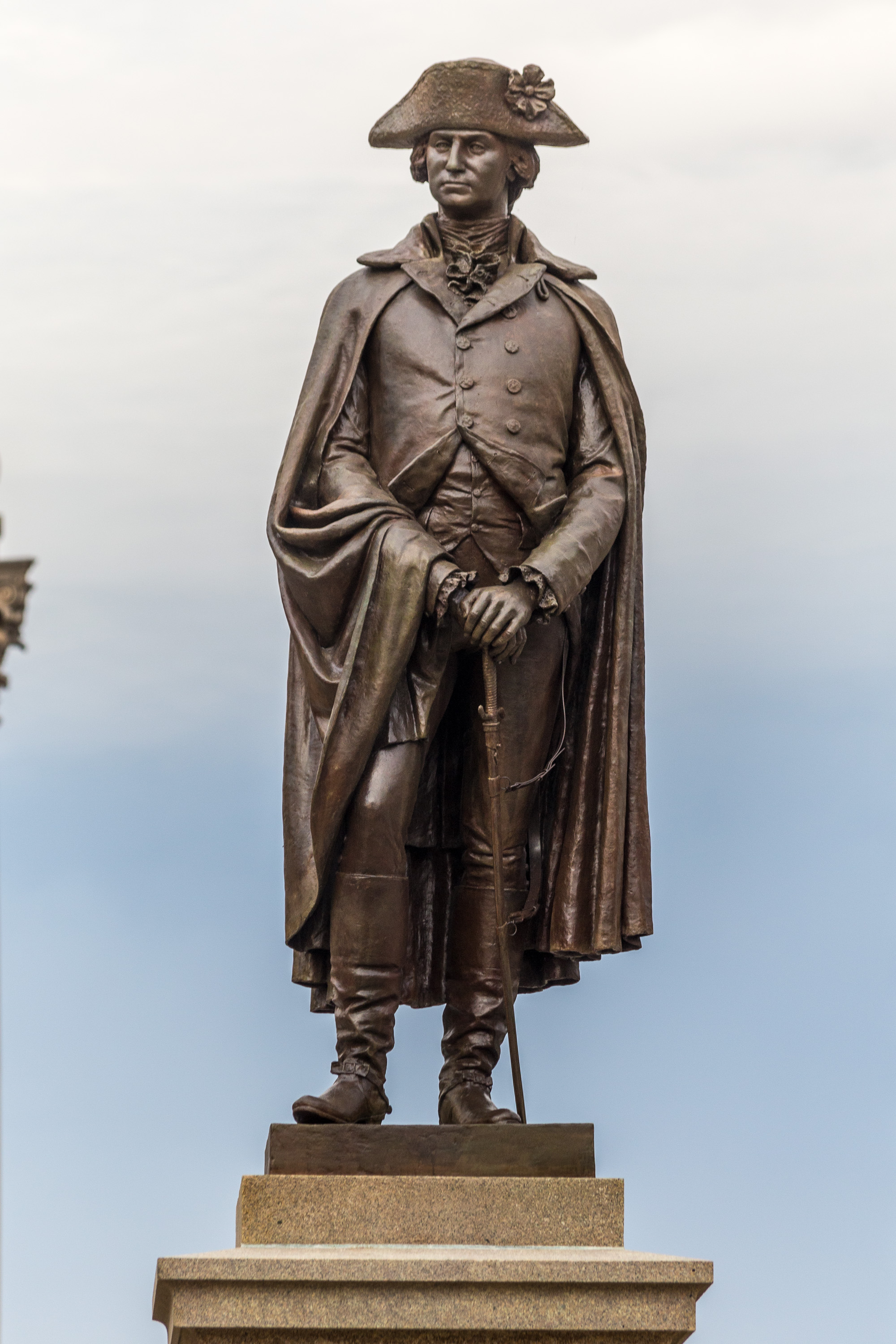
2019

Before and after the 2016-2017 restoration

A 1994 survey reported in the Smithsonian American Art Museum's Inventories of American Painting and Sculpture database indicated that the sculpture was deteriorating and that treatment was needed. Problems include that Washington's uniform is covered in dirt and corrosion and that part of the head of the bronze figure of a woman at Washington's feet is missing. Similar observations were included in a detailed report about the condition of the monument and works needed produced for the Westown Association in 2014. There had been no restoration work done since it was installed as Milwaukee's first piece of public art.

In July 2016, the statue was moved to the Conservation of Sculpture and Objects Studio in Forest Park, Illinois where Andrzej Dajnowski supervised its restoration. A great deal of fundraising has been done to support the work, which was expected to cost about $100,000, of which the Westown Association provided $60,000. The process of moving the statue revealed several additional challenges, including the rust in base that he described as "a big issue because [the original builders] inserted a 1 inch rod in both of his legs and that's why one of the legs is already splitting," and the possibility that Washington's sword is not the original but has been replaced at some point in the past.

The restored statue, now a dark bronze color instead of the previous green, was returned to its pedestal at North 9th St. and West Wisconsin Avenue in January 2018. As the 3,000 pounds (1,400 kg), 10-foot tall statue was hoisted into place by a crane, Mayor Tom Barrett observed that "our first piece of public art is in pristine condition."

== See also ==
- List of statues of George Washington
- List of sculptures of presidents of the United States
- Juneau Monument
- Thomas A. Hendricks Monument
