= William Henry Metcalf (businessman) =

American businessman

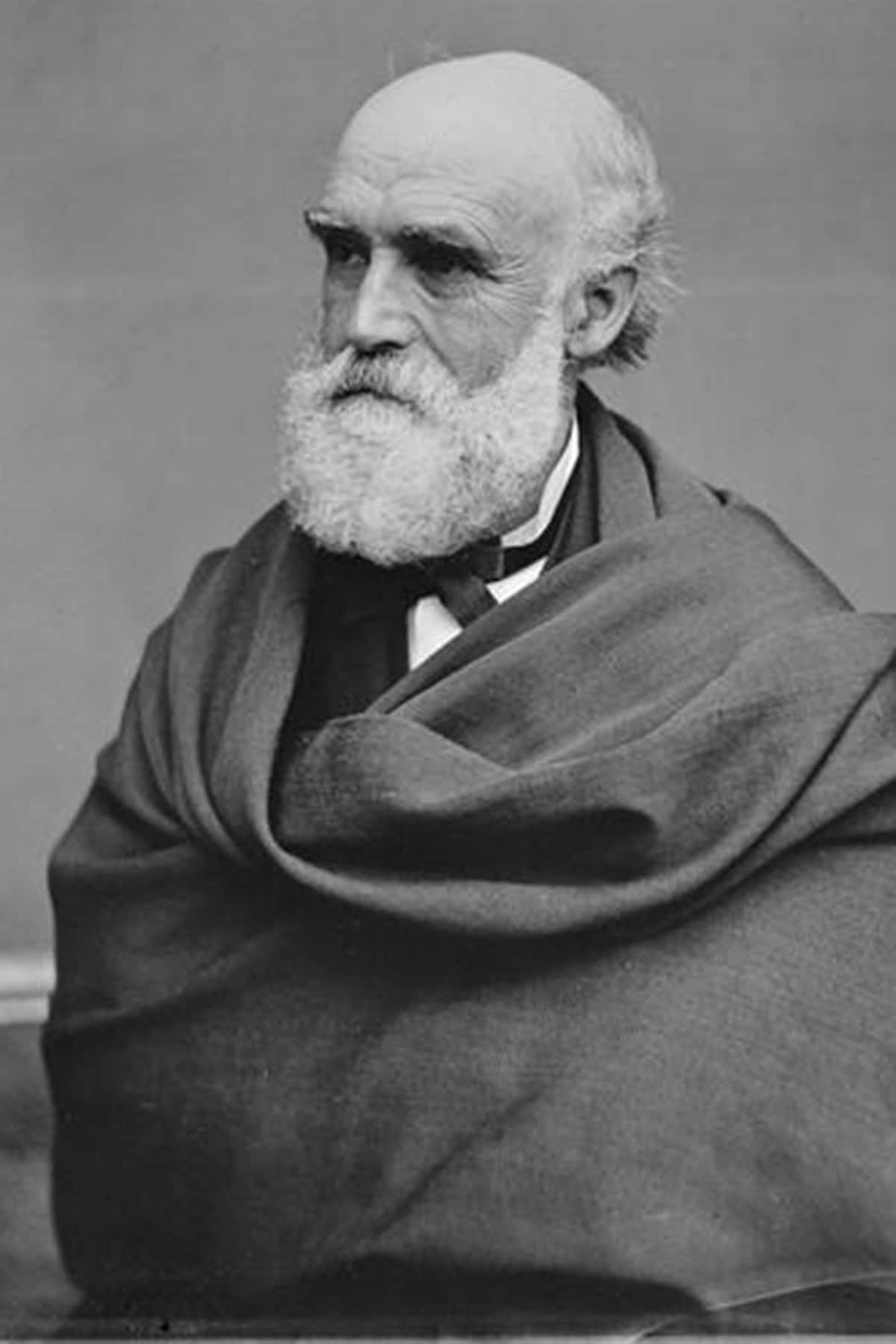
- Studio portrait of William H. Metcalf, c. 1880s
- Born: July 19, 1821; New York City, New York
- Died: April 8, 1892 (aged 70); Milwaukee, Wisconsin
- Burial place: Forest Home Cemetery, Milwaukee
- Occupations: Businessman, photographer
- Spouse: Caroline Tileston Metcalf
- Children: Mary Tileston Metcalf; Julia Metcalf Cary
- Relatives: Melbert B. Cary (son-in-law); Melbert B. Cary Jr. (grandson)

William Henry Metcalf (July 19, 1821 – April 8, 1892) was an American businessman, photographer, and art collector in Milwaukee, Wisconsin.

== Early life and career ==
The son of a portrait painter, Eliab Metcalf (1785–1834), he was born and raised in New York City.

He relocated to Milwaukee in 1843, where he met Massachusetts-born entrepreneur Charles Trueworth Bradley. Together, they formed the Bradley & Metcalf Company, which grew into the largest shoe manufacturer and wholesaler in the state.

== Photography ==
After befriending photographer H. H. Bennett, Metcalf took an interest in the medium, even providing funding for the construction of Bennett's studio in Wisconsin Dells in 1875. Two years later, Metcalf accompanied archeologist Edward Sylvester Morse on a trip to Japan, where he produced stereographic views of the country, later published and marketed by Bennett.

An art collector, Metcalf supported the creation of a public museum for Milwaukee, eventually rallying behind the project of industrialist Frederick Layton and becoming one of the first trustees of the Layton Art Gallery in 1888.

== Photographs of Japan ==
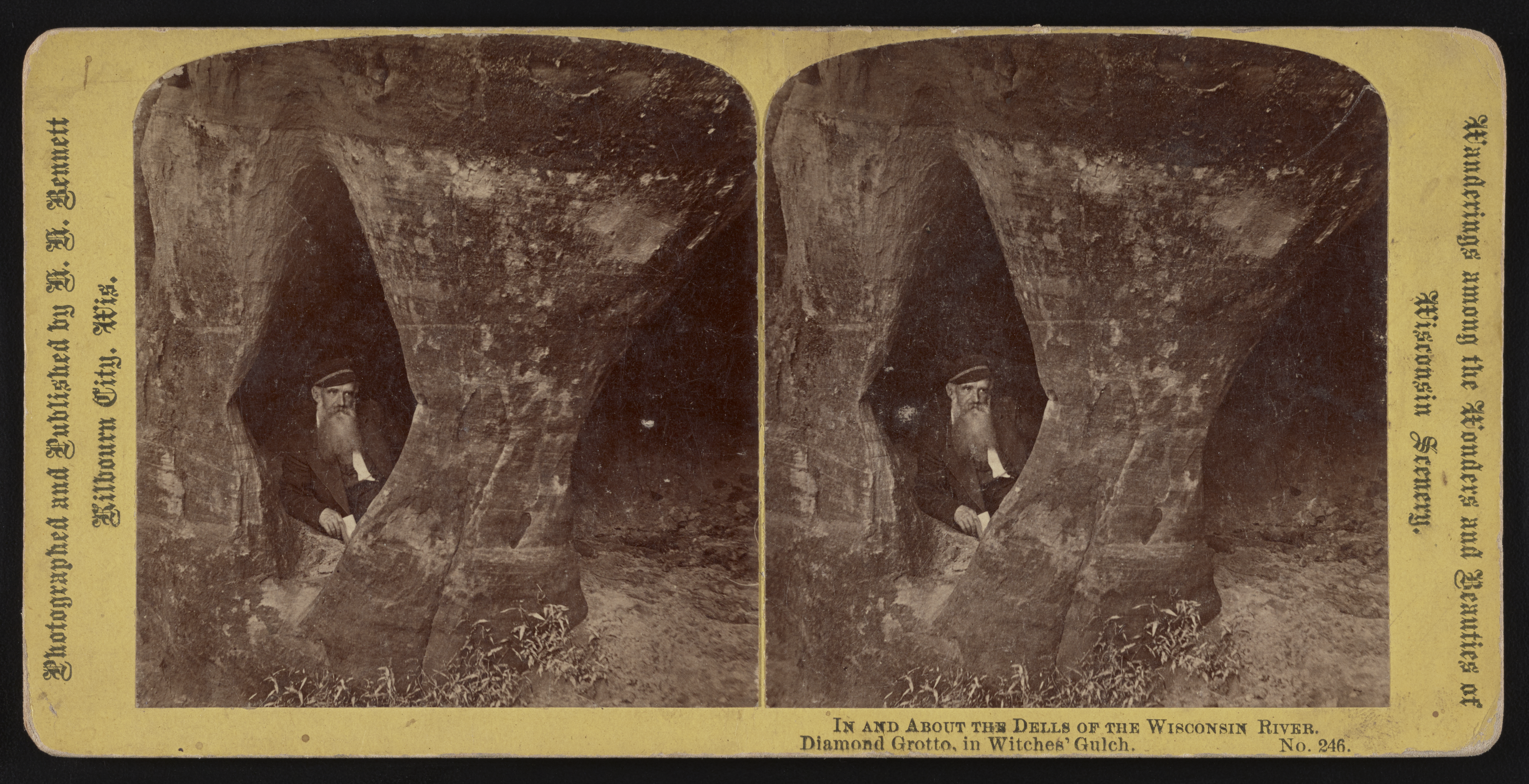
H. H. Bennett, Diamond Grotto, in Witches' Gulch, c. 1870s. The man posing has been identified as Metcalf

Metcalf was initiated into photography by Wisconsinite Henry Hamilton Bennett, a Civil War veteran, whom he accompanied on trips to the Dells of the Wisconsin River and for whom he occasionally posed. In June 1877, Metcalf and Edward Sylvester Morse sailed from San Francisco to Yokohama. Metcalf was carrying a portable "5 × 8 inch camera with convertible stereoscopic and photographic lenses" fabricated by H. H. Bennett for the purposes of the trip. The two men headed for Nikkō, before meeting with American educator David Murray in Tokyo. Metcalf then traveled on his own to Utsunomiya, Kamakura, Odawara, Enoshima, and Hakone, returning to the United States in October. H. H. Bennett selected twenty-six of Metcalf's stereographic views for publishing, grouping them under the title "A Summer in Japan". According to religious studies scholar Peter Romaskiewicz, Metcalf's images "went on to capture the imagination of generations of Americans who knew nothing about Japan or Asian countries."

Selections from William H. Metcalf's A Summer in Japan Series
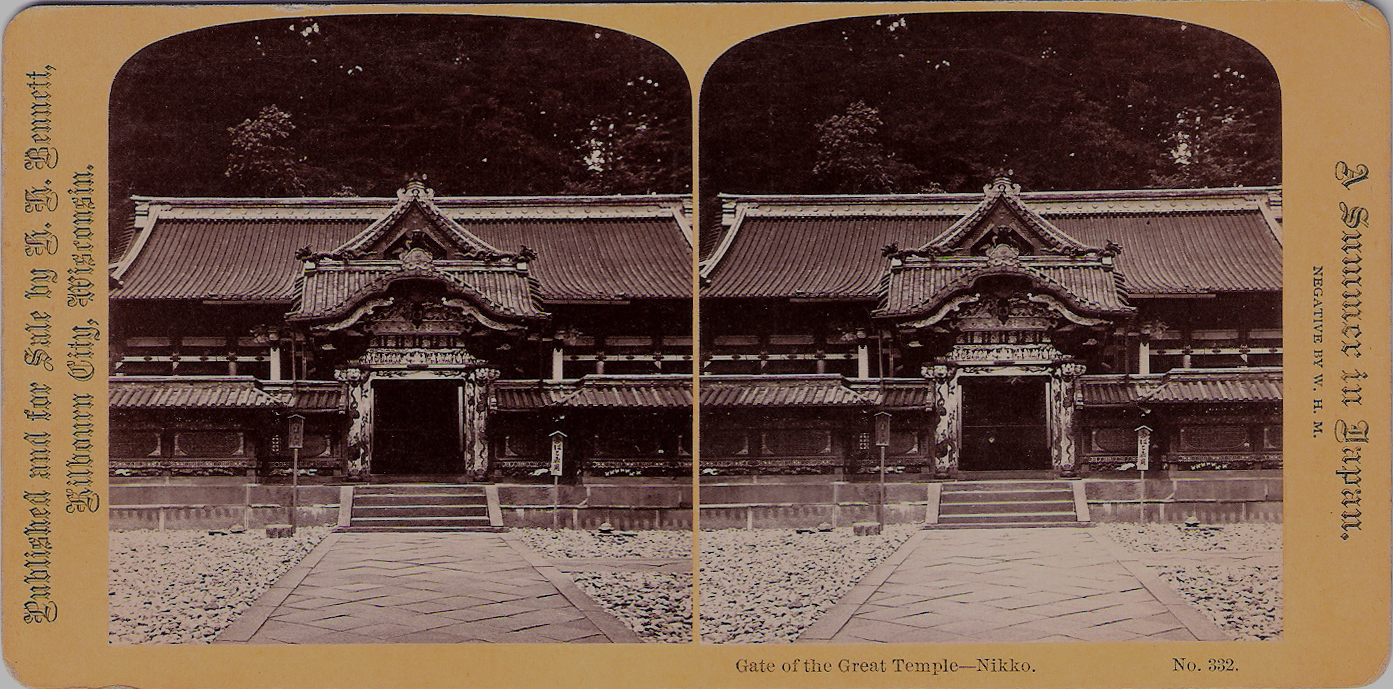
Gate of the Great Temple, Nikko, No. 332

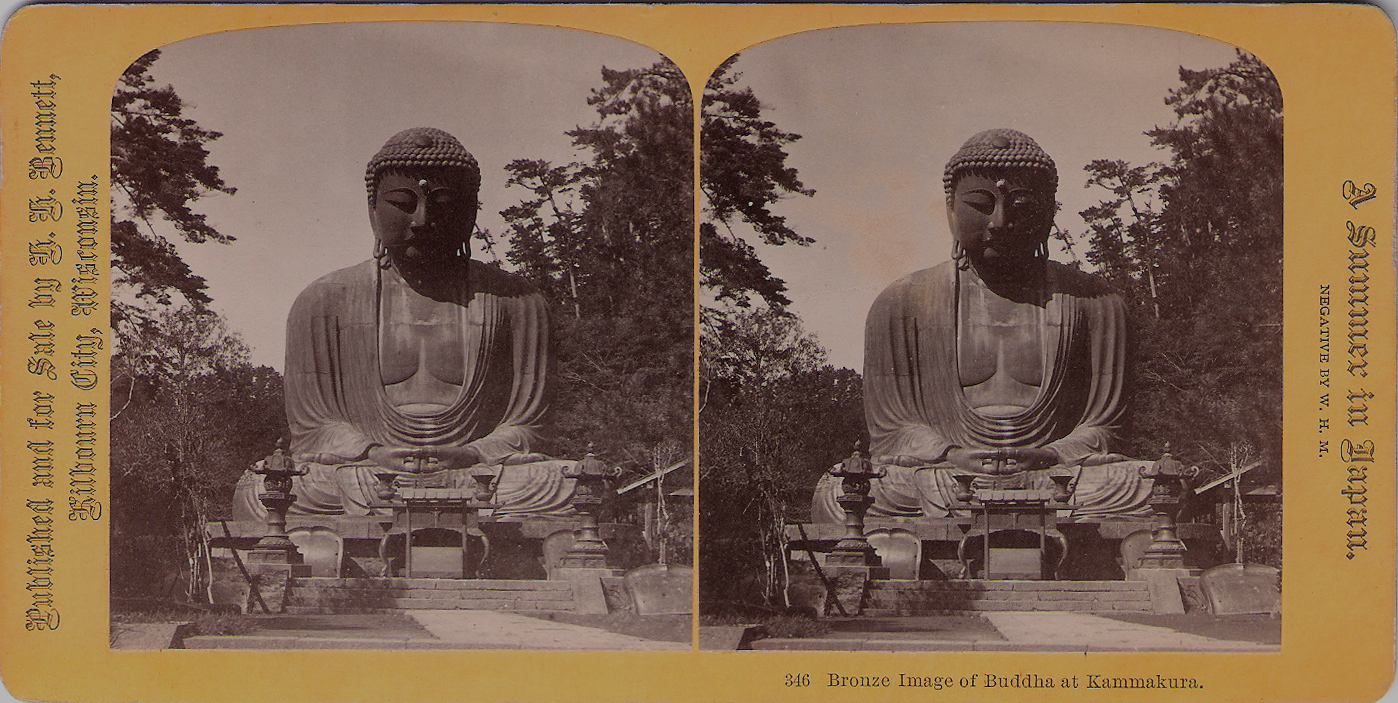
Bronze Image of Buddha, Kamakura, No. 346

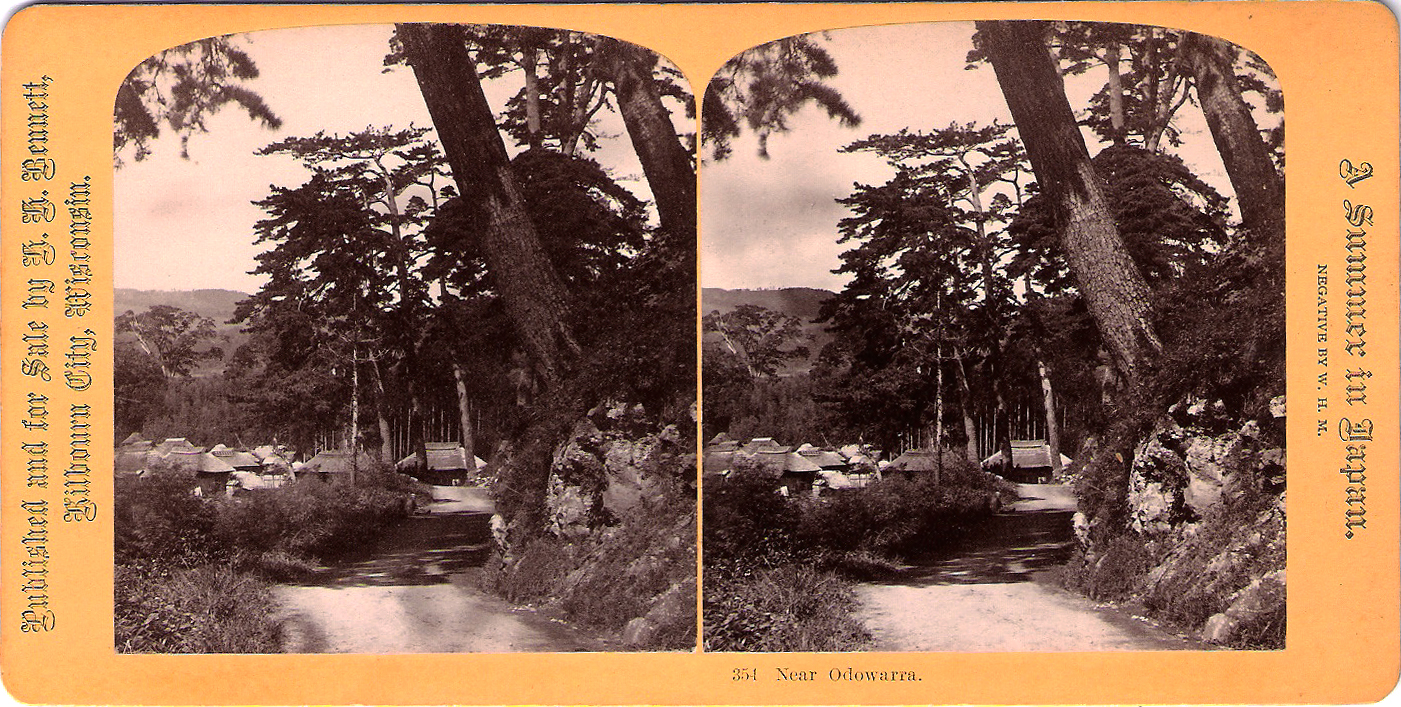
Near Odawara, No. 354

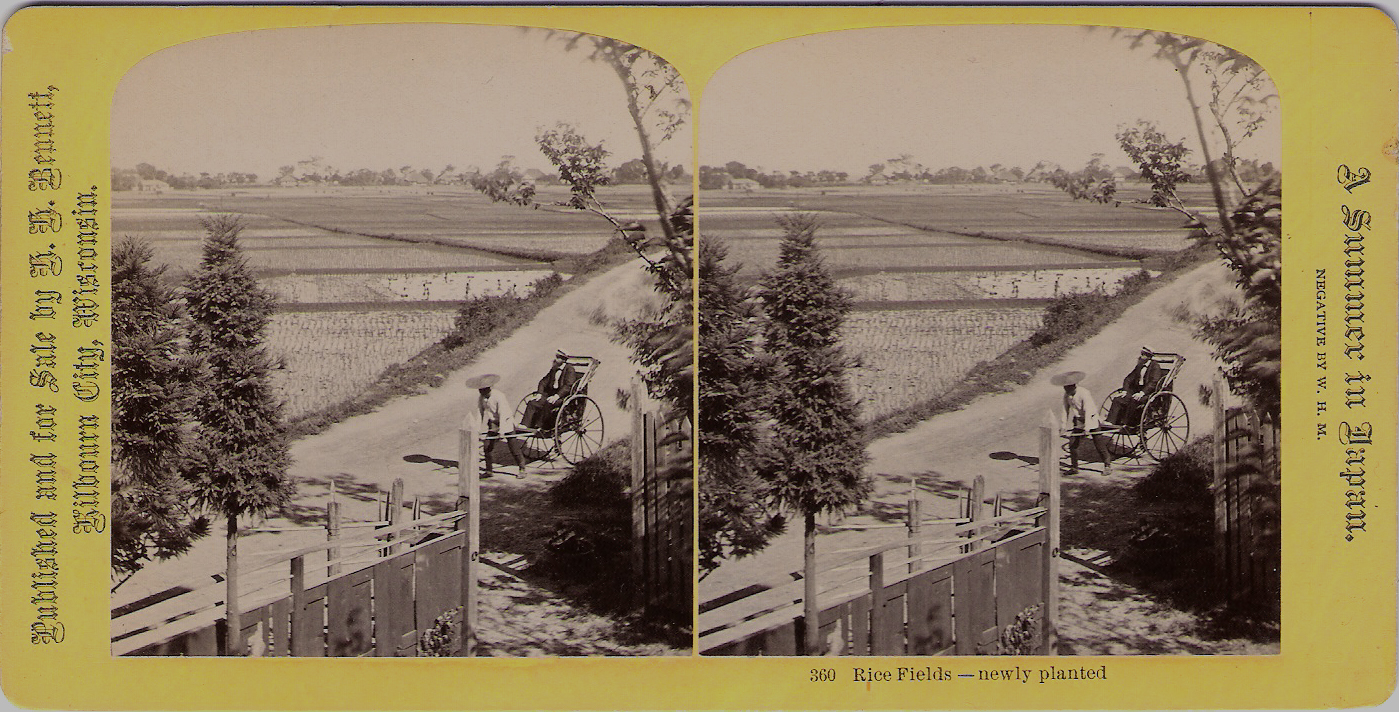
Rice Fields—Newly Planted, No. 360

== Art collection ==
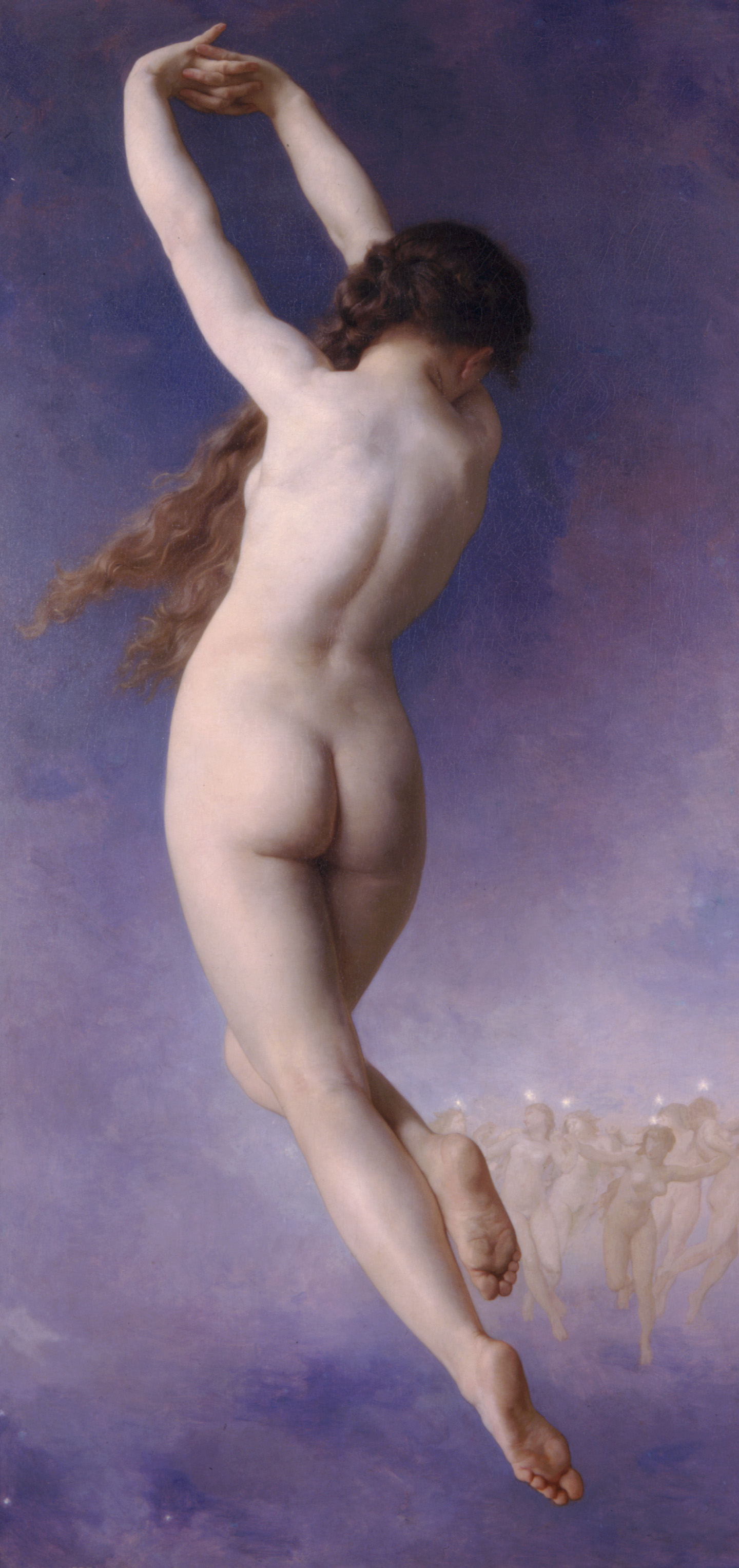
William-Adolphe Bouguereau, The Lost Pleiad, 1884

Metcalf gathered a collection of European and American artworks in his Italianate-style 1854 mansion on Cass St, Milwaukee. The majority of his art was acquired during business trips to Europe in the 1870s and 1880s, and Metcalf displayed it in a purpose-built gallery extension to his house. Among major works in the collection were William-Adolphe Bouguereau's The Lost Pleiad (1884), purchased from the artist's studio in Paris, and an 1870 portrait of artist James McNeill Whistler by Walter Greaves. Also included were genre scenes by Carl Frithjof Smith, Nikolaos Gyzis, and Charles Courtney Curran, as well as landscapes by David Johnson, Arthur B. Davies, Constant Troyon, Paul Weber, and Peter Moran.

Beginning in the mid-1870s, Metcalf supported various initiatives for art education in Milwaukee, such as the acquisition of a series of photographs of European painting and sculpture by Adolphe Braun, which artist John S. Conway had advised should be displayed in bookstores in the city. In 1882, Metcalf was appointed to the board of the art section of the newly-inaugurated Milwaukee Industrial Exposition Building, in charge of rotating exhibitions. Though he considered creating a proper art museum in town on his own funds, the proposal laid out by fellow businessman Frederick Layton to build such a structure in 1883 altered his plans. He became one of the early supporters of Layton's project and contributed donations throughout the construction phase. In addition, Metcalf and his business partner Bradley gifted a monument to Solomon Juneau, sculpted by Richard Henry Park, to the city of Milwaukee in 1887.

== Death ==
Metcalf died in Milwaukee on April 8, 1892. He was buried at Forest Home Cemetery. His widow Caroline moved to New York City in 1897, relocating her husband's art collection with her. Upon her own death in 1906, the collection was inherited by their daughter Julia, who sold it at auction at Anderson Galleries on February 18, 1913.
