= Sooper Yooper =

Series of children's books by Mark Newman and Mark Heckman

- Super Yooper: Environmental Defender; Super Yooper: The Quest of the Blue Crew; Sooper Yooper: H20; Sooper Yooper: Rockman to the Rescue
- Author: Mark Newman
- Illustrator: Mark Heckman
- Publisher: Green Junction Press
- No. of books: 4

Sooper Yooper is a series of children's books created by writer Mark Newman and artist Mark Heckman. The books chronicle the work of environmental superhero Billy Cooper, who defends the Great Lakes from invasive species from his headquarters in the Upper Peninsula of Michigan where residents are called Yoopers (derived from "U.P.-ers").

The series consists of four books: Super Yooper: Environmental Defender (2010) and Super Yooper: The Quest of the Blue Crew (2012), Sooper Yooper: H20, and Sooper Yooper: Rockman to the Rescue.

== History ==
Mark Heckman and Mark Newman met while working on a regional sports magazine in 1988. With a shared perspective of the world at large, the pair joined forces on a variety of projects, mostly billboards with social or environmental themes, during their 22-year creative partnership before Heckman's death in 2010. Racism, AIDS, homelessness, pollution and a number of water-related issues were among the topics addressed in their art-based works.

Examples of their efforts include "Afro Country Club", a billboard for a fictitious all-black country club to highlight racism; and "The Bum Rap", a billboard which employed rap lyrics to call attention to the plight of the homeless. Heckman's AIDS billboard used 2,001 condoms dipped in paint to create greater awareness of the acquired immune deficiency syndrome.

After talking a number of years about writing a children's book together, the two men collaborated on Sooper Yooper: Environmental Defender, published by Thunder Bay Press and the Wege Foundation. In 2012, Newman wrote and illustrated its sequel, Sooper Yooper: The Quest of the Blue Crew, published by Green Junction Press and the Wege Foundation. A prequel, Sooper Yooper: H2O, came out in 2018.

== Characters and themes ==
Billy Cooper is an ex-Navy SEAL, who is determined to do whatever he can about the increasing threats to the Great Lakes he loves. With his sidekick Mighty Mac, an English Bulldog, at his side, Cooper enlists the help of a green-minded philanthropist known as The Wedge to aid him in his efforts to defend the Great Lakes from invasive species and other environmental dangers. Cooper is not a typical crime fighter. The authors chose to give the main character no apparent superpowers in order to underscore their contention that "the average person – not someone endowed with X-ray vision or superhuman strength – can make a difference and help safeguard the planet." The Blue Crew is composed of super scientists based on the work of real-life biologists and invasive species experts, their teamwork emphasizing themes of cooperation and collaboration.

== School program ==
Since the release of the first book in 2010, Newman has embarked on a lengthy tour of schools in states that border the Great Lakes, including Illinois, Indiana, Michigan, Ohio and Wisconsin as well as the Canadian province of Ontario. Through the first six years of the Sooper Yooper tour, Newman has spoken to 135,875 students at 536 schools. His program includes a number of scientific specimen as examples, including sea lamprey, zebra mussel, Eurasian watermilfoil, rusty crayfish, emerald ash borer and spiny water fleas.
