= Washington Monument (disambiguation) =

The Washington Monument is a 555-foot tall obelisk on the National Mall in Washington, D.C.

Washington Monument may also refer to:

- Washington Monument (Baltimore), Maryland
- Washington Monument (Milwaukee), Wisconsin
- Washington Monument (Philadelphia), Pennsylvania
- Washington Monument (West Point), New York
- Washington Monument (Richmond, Virginia)
- Washington Monument (Boonsboro, Maryland)

== See also ==
- List of memorials to George Washington, a list of all types of memorials to George Washington
