= Publishers Group West =

Book distributor in Berkeley, California

- Founded: 1976; 50 years ago
- Headquarters: Berkeley, California, United States
- Services: Book distribution
- Parent: Ingram Content Group
- Website: www.pgw.com

Publishers Group West (PGW) is a book distributor founded in 1976 in Berkeley, California that has been owned by Ingram Content Group since 2016. They share their parent company's warehouse in Jackson, Tennessee and sales offices in New York, Toronto, and London.

== History ==
PGW was the largest distributor of independent presses in the United States during the 1990s.

In 2007, PGW was acquired by Perseus Books Group and some of PGW's publishers moved to Perseus's other divisions. Periodic additions to their list of publishers include an additional 5 added in 2012.

Within the book business, they were known for throwing a party at the annual BookExpo convention, with musical performers including Ivan Neville's Dumpstaphunk and Chaka Khan in 2012.

Perseus' distribution business was acquired by Ingram Content Group in 2016.

== Partial list of publishers ==
- 2.13.61
- Agate Publishing
- Archaia Studios Press
- Baker & Taylor Publishing Group
- Bilingual Books
- Black Classic Press
- Blast Books
- Classical Comics
- Cleis Press
- Counterpoint
- Frances Lincoln Publishers
- Grove/Atlantic, Inc., publisher of Cold Mountain, New York Times Bestseller
  - Grove Press
- Heyday Books
- Hunter House
- Keen Communications
- McSweeney's
- Milkweed Editions
- New World Library
- Night Shade Books (added 2012)
- Open City (defunct)
- Open Court Publishing Company
- Parallax Press, publisher of works by Thich Nhat Hanh
- Quest Books
- Rare Bird Books
- Re/Search
- Ronin Publishing
- Scarletta Press
- Seal Press
- Sierra Club Books
- Soft Skull Press
- TalentSmart, publishers of Emotional Intelligence 2.0
- Three Rooms Press
- Thunder Bay Press
- Tin House Books
- Urantia Foundation
- Wilderness Press
- Wisdom Publications

== Publishers formerly distributed by PGW ==
- NBM Publishing (1986-1988)
- Demos Medical Publishing, aka Demos Health (2005-2013)
