= Raincoast Books =

Canadian book company

- Type: Limited
- Industry: Book distribution
- Founded: 1979; 47 years ago
- Founder: Allan MacDougall, Mark Stanton
- Headquarters: Richmond, British Columbia, Canada
- Key people: John Sawyer (CEO); Pete MacDougall (Executive VP Sales and Marketing); Graham Fidler (Executive VP Publishers Group Canada)
- Products: Books
- Number of employees: 100
- Website: www.raincoastgroup.com

Raincoast Books is a Canadian book distribution and wholesale company. Based in Vancouver, British Columbia, Raincoast was founded by Mark Stanton and Allan MacDougall in 1979 as a consignment wholesaler that shared overhead, warehouse space and staff with the pair's sales agency, Stanton & MacDougall. Today, Raincoast has over 90 employees and three divisions: Raincoast Distribution, Publishers Group Canada.

== Divisions ==
=== Raincoast Distribution ===
Raincoast Distribution is a Canadian company which provides complete sales, marketing and fulfillment services to a wide range of general trade and gift publishers from the United States, Britain and Canada. Companies distributed by Raincoast include Chronicle Books, Drawn & Quarterly, Houghton Mifflin Harcourt, Lonely Planet, New Harbinger and St. Martin's Press.

==== Publishers represented by Raincoast Distribution ====
Alma Books
Beginning Press
Birdhouse Kids Media
BIS Publishers
Bilingual Books, Inc.
Bloomsbury
Celadon Books
Chronicle Books
Creative Company
Drawn & Quarterly
Encantos
Entangled Publishing
Familius
Farrar, Straus and Giroux (FSG)
Figure 1
Flatiron Books
Galison + Mudpuppy
Game Seven Books
Games Room
Gibbs Smith
Greywolf Press
Hardie Grant
Harriman House
Henry Holt & Co.
Kingfisher
Laurence King
Levine Querido
Lonely Planet
Macmillan Publishers Group
Magnetic Poetry
Media Lab Books
Minotaur
The Mountaineers Books
Neon Squid
New Harbinger Publications
Osprey
Page Two
Petit Collage
Picador
Pownal Street Press
Priddy Books
Princeton Architectural Press
Prufrock Press
Quadrille
Raincoast Books
Ridley's Games
Sounds True
Sourcebooks
St. Martin's Publishing Group
Tor/Forge
Twirl

=== Publishers Group Canada ===
Publishers Group Canada (PGC) was acquired by Raincoast Books in 2000. Based in Toronto, Ontario, PGC distributes independently owned book publishing houses including Grove Atlantic, New World Library and Egmont Books in Canada.

=== BookExpress ===
BookExpress is a wholesale division supplying Canadian bookstores and retailers. BookExpress carries bestselling books from publishers including Random House Canada, Penguin Books Canada, HarperCollins Canada, Scholastic Canada, Diamond Book Distribution and Firefly.

== Raincoast Publishing ==
Between 1995 and 2008, Raincoast Books was also a book publisher. The Raincoast publishing program produced a range of fiction and non-fiction titles for both adults and children. Authors who published work with Raincoast included Anne Fleming, Alison Pick, Colin McAdam, Nick Bantock, George Bowering, Paul William Roberts, Naim Kattan, Roy Miki, Amanda K. Hale, and Bill Gaston. As a publisher, the company was noted for using large amounts of recycled paper in its books. In January 2008, Raincoast announced that it would cease to publish new books due to the rise in the Canadian dollar. Raincoast also ceased to be the Canadian publisher of J.K. Rowling's Harry Potter books in 2010.
