= Bilingual Books =

American publishing company

Bilingual Books, Inc.
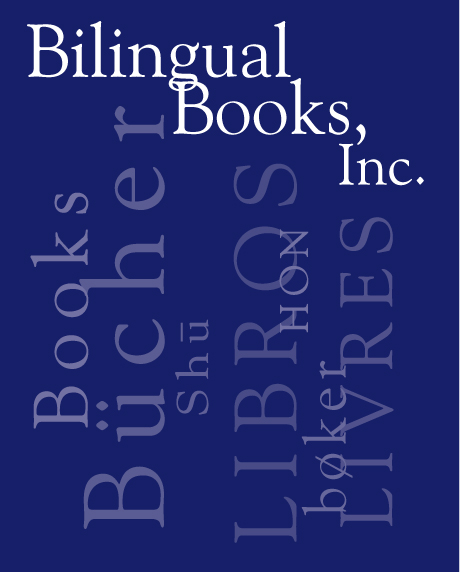
- Founded: 1981
- Founder: Kristine K. Kershul, founder
- Country of origin: United States
- Headquarters location: Seattle, Washington
- Distribution: Gazelle Books (UK); Publishers Group West (US)
- Publication types: Computer Software, Books; Audio Programs, Phrase Guides
- Nonfiction topics: Foreign Language Learning
- Official website: www.bbks.com

Bilingual Books, Inc. is a privately held publishing company that develops foreign language learning products. Headquartered in Seattle, Washington, the company publishes interactive computer software, books, audio programs and phrase guides for 20 different languages.

== History ==
Bilingual Books, Inc. was founded in 1981 by Kristine K. Kershul, a language scholar and teacher planning a career in academia and working towards a doctorate in Medieval German Languages and Literature. While teaching at the university level, she observed that the majority of her students were learning a foreign language for personal reasons such as an upcoming trip abroad, researching family history, or dating someone who spoke the language. Seeing that the traditional academic methods, designed for those majoring in the language, were not best suited to help her students achieve their goals she decided to develop a way to learn, in a short amount of time, practical and relevant conversation skills they could use.

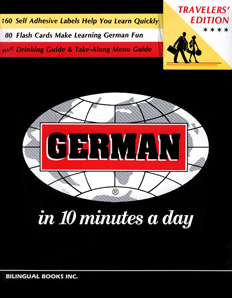
First edition, published 1981.

Kershul authored her first book, German in 10 Minutes a Day, with the intention to return to her academic career, but the success of the publication became the catalyst for more books in other languages and within a year, the Seattle company began worldwide distribution with five titles, adding French, Italian, Spanish and Chinese.

The company was sold to Sunset Books and Magazine in 1988 and seven years later, in 1995, Kershul reacquired it.

In 1999, the first Language Maps were published in Spanish, French, German and Italian, as an alternative to traditional phrase guides.

In 2004, the company continued its expansion by publishing audio programs for its Spanish, French, German and Italian titles.

Beginning in 2007, Bilingual Books developed computer software as a complement to the 10 Minutes a Day books.

By 2011, the company had published more than 50 titles in 20 languages.

=== Support to military ===
In 2003, as part of the company's commitment to support U.S. military forces deployed to Iraq, Arabic a Language Map was released.

In 2010, a Pashto version of the Language Map was released for troops serving in Afghanistan. A Dari version followed in 2011.

=== Registered trademarks ===
In April 1986, the "10 minutes a day" trademark was registered in the United States to Bilingual Books.

The "Language Map" trademark was registered May 2005 in the United States, July 2005 in the United Kingdom, and January 2006 in Canada.

== Offices ==
Bilingual Books, Inc. is headquartered in Seattle, Washington in the Nordby Building at Seattle's Fishermen's Terminal. All employees speak more than one language, have taught or tutored a language and have traveled abroad.

=== Consultants ===
The company hires native speakers, educators, and professional translators from various countries for each project to collaboratively review all aspects of the language, including grammar, spelling, pronunciation and artwork.

=== Production, warehouse and distribution ===
All production is executed wholly in the United States. Warehouses are maintained in Canada, England, Seattle, Washington and Jackson, Tennessee. Key distributors for the company include Raincoast Books in Vancouver, BC, Canada, Gazelle Books in Lancaster, England and Publishers Group West in California.

== Methodology ==
The 10 minutes a day method teaches the basics of the language in 10-minute daily chunks. As the program progresses, it gradually incorporates more of the foreign language, building step-by-step, until the program is almost completely taught in the foreign language.

The method differs from the intensive grammar method of traditional language textbooks required in classroom study. It teaches patterns instead of complicated grammar rules and uses colorful visuals along with various study tools. Drawings of countries' currencies, signs and everyday items from food to clothing are among the visual associations constructed into the program.

The method engages different learning styles (visual, auditory and kinesthetic) with computer software games, audio, sticky labels (peel-off stick-on vocabulary labels), cut-out menu guides, flashcards and word games.

== Products ==
The company publishes 50 titles, 20 languages and three product lines, including the 10 Minutes a Day Book Series, the 10 Minutes a Day Audio Series and the Language Map Series.

== Languages ==
Bilingual Books, Inc. publishes products for the following 20 languages:

Languages	Phrase Guides	Books with Software	Books with Audio
Arabic	♦	♦	
Chinese	♦	♦	
Dari	♦		
Persian	♦		
French	♦	♦	♦
German	♦	♦	♦
Greek	♦		
Hawaiian	♦		
Hebrew	♦	♦	
English	♦	♦	
Italian	♦	♦	♦
Japanese	♦	♦	
Norwegian	♦	♦	
Pashto	♦		
Polish	♦		
Portuguese	♦	♦	
Russian	♦	♦	
Spanish	♦	♦	♦
Swahili	♦		
Vietnamese	♦		

== See also ==
- Language education
- Kristine Kershul
