= Then and Now (books) =

Book series published by Salamander Books

Then and Now is a series of books published by Salamander Books, a subsidiary of Pavilion Books. In the United States, Thunder Bay Press publishes some books of the series as well.

The series began in the 1960s under the imprint of B. T. Batsford Ltd. and now covers historical photographic collections compared with contemporary photographs across the world.

== Series list ==
The Pavilion Books 'Then and Now' included in the series for the United Kingdom and Australia: –

=== United Kingdom ===
- Birmingham
- London
- Manchester

=== Australia ===
- Brisbane
- Melbourne
- Perth
- Sydney

Books are also published by Thunder Bay Press for the United States.

=== United States ===
- New England
- Boston
- New York City
- Central Park (Manhattan)
- Brooklyn
- Atlantic City
- New Jersey
- Philadelphia
- Pittsburgh
- Baltimore
- Washington, DC
- Charlotte
- Charleston
- Atlanta
- Savannah
- Birmingham
- Orlando
- Miami
- Cleveland
- Columbus (and Ohio State University)
- Detroit
- Indianapolis
- Chicago
- Chicago from the air
- Milwaukee
- Minneapolis/St. Paul
- St. Louis
- Kansas City
- Nashville
- Memphis
- New Orleans
- Dallas
- Austin
- Houston
- San Antonio
- Denver
- Albuquerque
- Phoenix
- Salt Lake City
- Las Vegas
- Seattle
- Portland
- San Francisco
- East Bay
- Los Angeles
- Los Angeles from the air
- Hollywood
- Orange County
- San Diego
- Honolulu
- Alaska
- San Juan
- Puerto Rico
- Ballparks
- New York Yankees
- Civil War Battlefields

=== Canada ===
- Montreal
- Vancouver

=== Caribbean ===
- Havana

=== Europe ===
- Berlin, Germany
- Prague, Czechia
- Paris, France
- Rome, Italy
- Barcelona

=== Asia ===
- Beijing, China
