= Drake Fountain =

- Columbus Monumen
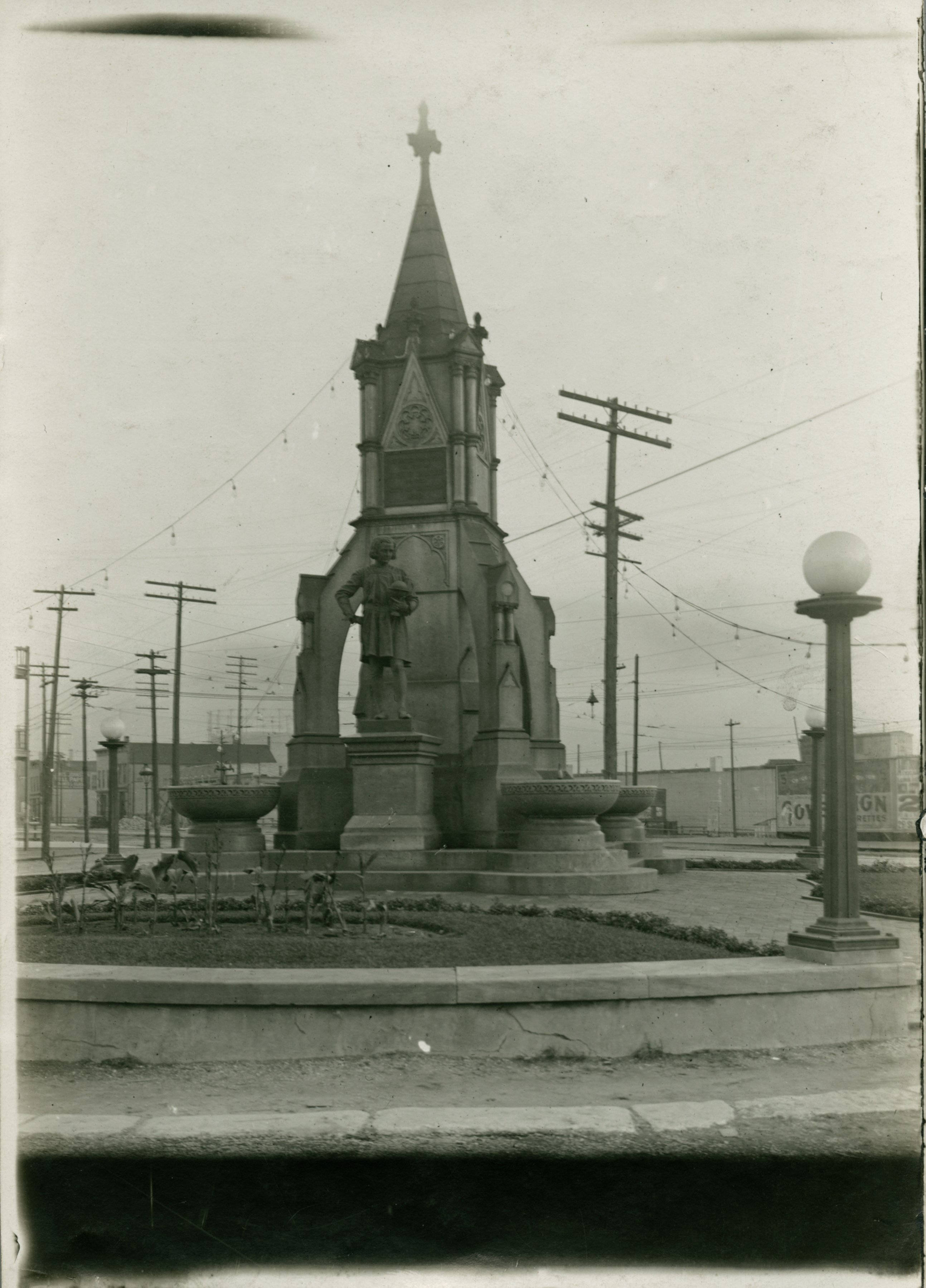
- " October 13, 1912, 5pm, Columbus"--Photograph verso. Drake Fountain by Richard Henry Park, 1893. East 92nd Street at South Chicago and Exchange Ave., Chicago.
- Medium: Bronze sculpture
- Condition: Removed
- Location: Chicago, United States
- 41.7281°N 87.5527°W

The Drake Fountain, also known as the Columbus Monument, is located on a triangular site bounded by 92nd Street, South Chicago Avenue and Exchange Avenue in the Chicago neighborhood known as South Chicago.

== History ==
John B. Drake, owner of the city's Grand Pacific Hotel and later the Drake and Blackstone Hotels, gave the fountain to the residents so those in The Loop would have chilled drinking water. The structure was designed by Richard Henry Park and originally stood on Washington Street adjacent to Chicago City Hall. The monument was dedicated in December 1892 to the 400th anniversary of the first voyage of Christopher Columbus. In 1906, it was moved to LaSalle Street and, in 1909, to its present site.

== Architecture ==
The fountain is composed of granite and designed in the Gothic Revival style. It consists of a square column with a pyramidal cap on a quatrefoil base. The column and cap are ornamented with classical columns and other carvings. At each corner of the column is a flying buttress which rises behind a large circular basin. The basins originally were drinking fountains and were chilled by ice blocks placed in the monument's base but currently serve as planters. The chambers under the fountain were large enough to accommodate two-tons of ice.

A bronze statue of Christopher Columbus stands in front of the column on a square granite base. Columbus is depicted during his university days and holds a globe in his left hand and a compass in his right. Above the statue is a bronze plaque stating ICE WATER FOUNTAIN GIFT OF JOHN B. DRAKE TO THE CITY OF CHICAGO 1892.

The fountain was refurbished in 1986 and became a Chicago landmark on March 10, 2004. It was rededicated on October 8, 2004.

== Removal of Christopher Columbus statue ==
On July 31, 2020, the Drake Fountain Columbus statue, which was also the last Christopher Columbus monument in Chicago, was removed for an undisclosed period. The Mayor's office released a statement claiming "Following public safety concerns over planned demonstrations similar to the one in Grant Park two weeks ago, the city has temporarily relocated the Christopher Columbus statue at Drake Fountain in the South Chicago neighborhood until further notice.”

== See also ==
- List of monuments and memorials to Christopher Columbus
