= Kristine Kershul =

Language book publisher

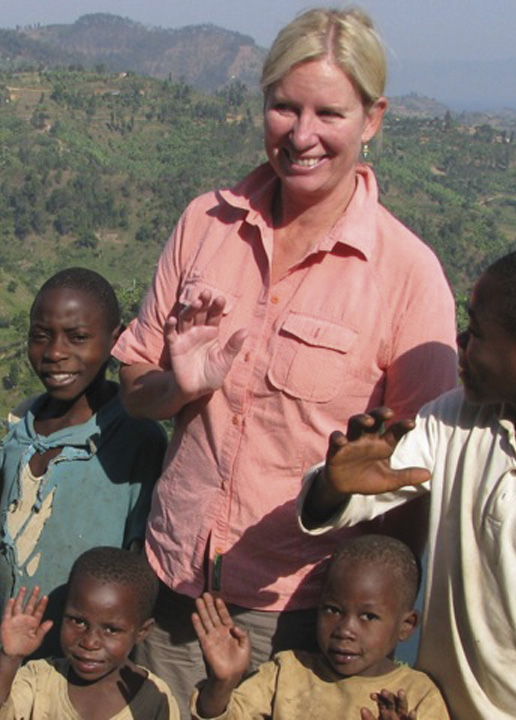
- Kristine Kershul, Rwanda
- Born: Kristine K. Kershul; Oregon, U.S.
- Education: Undergraduate and Graduate Degrees in German Languages and Literature
- Occupations: Author, Publisher; Linguist, Teacher; Creator of the 10 Minutes a Day Series and the Language Map Series; Founder and President of Bilingual Books, Inc.
- Writing career
- Genre: Foreign Language Learning
- Notable works: 10 Minutes a Day Book Series; 10 Minutes a Day Audio Series; Language Map Series
- Website: www.kershul.com

Kristine K. Kershul is an American author, publisher, linguist and teacher. Kershul founded Bilingual Books, Inc. in 1981 with the publication of her first book, German in 10 Minutes a Day and the development of the 10 Minutes a Day Series. She has authored books, audio, phrase guides and interactive computer software for 20 languages.

== Background ==
Kershul attributes her lifelong passion for languages to her family. She grew up in a trilingual home where in addition to English, her father spoke Croatian and her mother spoke Danish.

Kershul studied in the U.S., then took her academic endeavors to Heidelberg, Germany where she earned her undergraduate and graduate degrees. She received a second graduate degree from the University of California at Santa Barbara and then went on to do her doctoral studies in German Languages and Literature.

=== Early Career, 1971 - 1981 ===
Kershul worked her way through school as a bilingual tour guide, traveling all over Europe and parts of Asia and Africa.

She also served as a translator for the U.S. Embassy in Bonn, West Germany and for Berlitz in Europe and the U.S. She spent ten years teaching at universities in Germany and the U.S. where she noticed students experiencing the same problems. They were self-conscious speaking and Kershul wanted to help them progress to the level where they were laughing and using the language comfortably.

The idea for her first book grew out of what she observed as a teacher and a traveler.

== Bilingual Books, 1981 - 1988 and 1995 - Present ==
Kershul saw the need for a language instruction method that would not intimidate or frustrate beginning students. She wanted to fill the gap between text books and traditional phrase books. She developed a fresh approach to learning a foreign language, which remained academically solid while geared to the traveler. In 1981 she designed and wrote her first book, German in 10 Minutes a Day, which was the beginning of a series of language-learning books that launched Bilingual Books, Inc. By the end of the first ten months, Kershul had authored a total of five books, adding French, Spanish, Italian and Chinese to create the 10 Minutes a Day Series. In the next three years, she would add Inglés, Norwegian, Japanese, Russian and Hebrew languages to the Series.

In 1988 Kershul sold her company to Sunset Books and Magazine. She moved to Cape Town, South Africa and spent the next six years traveling around the world.

In 1995, Kershul reacquired Bilingual Books and moved back to the Pacific Northwest to base the company out of Seattle, Washington. In the following years, she expanded the breadth of languages to 20 and added new product lines with the creation of the Language Map Series, the 10 Minutes a Day Audio Series, and the 10 Minutes a Day software.

== Publications ==
=== 10 Minutes a Day Book Series ===
1. ARABIC in 10 minutes a day
2. CHINESE in 10 minutes a day
3. FRENCH in 10 minutes a day
4. GERMAN in 10 minutes a day
5. HEBREW in 10 minutes a day
6. INGLÉS en 10 minutos al día
7. ITALIAN in 10 minutes a day
8. JAPANESE in 10 minutes a day
9. NORWEGIAN in 10 minutes a day
10. PORTUGUESE in 10 minutes a day
11. RUSSIAN in 10 minutes a day
12. SPANISH in 10 minutes a day

=== 10 Minutes a Day Audio Series ===
1. FRENCH in 10 minutes a day Book + Audio
2. GERMAN in 10 minutes a day Book + Audio
3. ITALIAN in 10 minutes a day Book + Audio
4. SPANISH in 10 minutes a day Book + Audio

=== Language Map Series ===
1. ARABIC a language map
2. CHINESE a language map
3. DARI a language map
4. FARSI a language map
5. FRENCH a language map
6. GERMAN a language map
7. GREEK a language map
8. HAWAIIAN a language map
9. HEBREW a language map
10. INGLÉS un mapa del lenguaje
11. ITALIAN a language map
12. JAPANESE a language map
13. NORWEGIAN a language map
14. PASHTO a language map
15. POLISH a language map
16. PORTUGUESE a language map
17. RUSSIAN a language map
18. SPANISH a language map
19. SWAHILI a language map
20. VIETNAMESE a language map
