= Readerlink Distribution Services =

American book publisher and distributor

- Status: Active
- Founded: 2013; 13 years ago
- Country of origin: United States
- Headquarters location: Oak Brook, Illinois
- Key people: Dennis E. Abboud
- Publication types: Hardcover, trade, & paperback books
- Revenue: > $1 billion (2016)
- No. of employees: 1,300
- Official website: www.readerlink.net

Readerlink Distribution Services, is an American book publisher and distributor based in Oak Brook, Illinois. Readerlink is the largest distributor of books to mass merchandisers in United States, and the largest distributor of hardcover, trade and paperback books to non-trade channel booksellers in North America.

Servicing approximately 66,000 storefronts in the United States, Readerlink distributes about one out of every three consumer trade books sold in the country. As of 2016, the company had distribution centers in Clearfield, Utah; Denton, Texas; Romeoville, Illinois; Salem, Virginia; and Winder, Georgia. Dennis E. Abboud serves as Readerlink's President and CEO.

== History ==
The company was founded in 2013.

- In 2014 Readerlink acquired the retail book business of TNG GP. Likewise, Readerlink's field merchandising services unit was spun into TNG's remaining operation.
- In 2015 Readerlink significantly expanded its role in the book publishing and distribution business by acquiring the North Carolina–based book distributor firm of Baker and Taylor's (B&T's) publishing group and U.S. marketing services. The acquisition included B&T's publishing operations for Silver Dolphin Books, Thunder Bay Press, Portable Press, and Canterbury Classics. Those imprints, which collectively publish about 500 titles annually, will be continued by Readerlink.
- In 2016 Readerlink acquired the retail book distribution business of ANConnect.
- In 2016 Readerlink acquired Studio Fun International, formerly Reader's Digest Children's Publishing, from Trusted Media Brands, Inc.
- In 2020 Readerlink acquired the activity book publisher Dreamtivity.
- In 2022 Readerlink became the US distributor for British publisher Canelo
- In 2025 Readerlink announced they would acquire Baker and Taylor, the largest library wholesaler in the United States. Readerlink had previously acquired B&T's publishing group and U.S. marketing services in 2015. However, the acquisition was later cancelled.
