= List of book distributors =

This is a list of book distributors, companies that act as distributors for book publishers, selling primarily to the book trade. The list includes defunct and merged/acquired companies, and distributors whose primary business is not books, such as comic books. The companies may provide exclusive distribution rights, or act as a wholesaler or warehouser of publisher's titles. Many of the companies distribute other products, and some also sell directly to the public. Book distributors offer a consolidated list of publishers' titles, so that bookstores can purchase from a wider range of publishers than if they had to open separate accounts with each publisher, who often require a minimum order that the bookstore might not be able to meet. Most small or independent publishers have relationships with a distributor, including self-published authors, who often use services like Amazon.com to sell to the public. The large publishing companies, including the "Big Five" (Penguin Random House, Hachette, Macmillan, HarperCollins and Simon & Schuster), act as distributors for the numerous imprints they have acquired over the years.

== United States ==
- AK Press
- Alibris
- Amazon.com, not strictly a distributor to the trade, but acts as a de facto distributor for many self-published authors and small presses
- Anchor Distributors
- Baker & Taylor (portions of Baker & Taylor were acquired by Readerlink Distribution Services in February 2015) (sold to book distributor Follett in April 2016, ending B&T's status as an independent and forcing change in B&T's management). Out of business due to Chapter 11 Bankruptcy as of March 2026.
- Barnes & Noble
- Blackstone Audio
- Casemate
- Diamond Comic Distributors (comics)
  - Capital City Distribution (comics, acquired by Diamond)
  - New Media/Irjax (acquired by Diamond)
- Distributed Art Publishers
- Draft2Digital
- Follett Corporation
- Greenleaf Book Group, distributor and hybrid publisher
- Heroes World Distribution, owned by Marvel Comics
- Independent Publishers Group, owned by Chicago Review Press
- Ingram Content Group
  - Consortium Book Sales & Distribution
  - Publishers Group West
  - Two Rivers (formerly Perseus Distribution)
- Last Gasp
- Midpoint Trade Books
- Perseus Books Group
- PublishDrive Inc.
- Readerlink Distribution Services (largest book distributor to mass merchandisers in United States)
- Rowman & Littlefield
- Send the Light
- Small Press Distribution
- Smashwords, global ebook distribution
- TAN Books
- Texas Bookman
- Tuttle Publishing
- University of Chicago Press, distribution (warehousing, fulfillment, and marketing) for many university presses and small non-profit publishers.

== Canada ==
- Fitzhenry & Whiteside
- Raincoast Books
- Thomas Allen & Son
- University of British Columbia Press
- University of Toronto Press

== Asia ==
- Booktopia, Australia
- Dangdang, China
- Diamond Comics, India
- Flipkart, India
- India Book House, India
- Jarir Bookstore, Saudi Arabia
- JD.com, China
- Reformers Bookshop, Australia
- Rokomari, Bangladesh

== Europe ==
- Baker & Taylor, United Kingdom
- Bookwire, Germany
- Gardners Books, United Kingdom
- Hachette Livre, France
- Ingram Publisher Services UK, United Kingdom
- Logista, Spain
- Macmillan Publishers, United Kingdom
- Penguin Random House, United Kingdom
- Simpkin & Marshall, United Kingdom
- Streetlib, Italy

== See also ==
- List of online booksellers
- Lists of publishing companies
