= Thunder Bay Press =

American publishing company

- Parent company: Readerlink Distribution Services, LLC
- Founded: 1990
- Country of origin: United States
- Headquarters location: San Diego, California
- Distribution: Publishers Group West
- Publication types: Illustrated books
- Nonfiction topics: adult crafts & leisure activities; pop culture; cooking; pets & domestic animals; sports; history; transportation; & nature
- Fiction genres: Non-fiction
- Official website: www.thunderbaybooks.com

Thunder Bay Press is a California-based publisher of illustrated non-fiction books. Subject matter includes adult crafts and leisure activities, pop culture, cooking, pets and domestic animals, sports, history, transportation, and nature.

Thunder Bay was founded by the book distributor Advanced Marketing Services in 1990. Advanced Marketing Services was acquired by Baker & Taylor in 2007.

It is owned by the book distribution firm, Readerlink Distribution Services, who acquired Thunder Bay from Baker & Taylor in 2015. The imprint's distribution is handled by Publishers Group West.

== Publications ==
=== Then and Now series ===
It is also one of the two United States publisher of books in the Then and Now series of books, published in the United Kingdom and Australia by Pavilion Books, that include:

- Mitchell, Alexander D (2001). Baltimore then & now. Thunder Bay Press. ISBN 978-1-57145-688-5.
- Richards, Hanje (2002). Minneapolis-Saint Paul Then and Now. Thunder Bay Press. ISBN 978-1-57145-687-8.
- Reiss, Marcia; Witheridge, Annette (2005). New York then & now (Revised ed.). Thunder Bay Press. ISBN 978-1-59223-649-7.

=== Bathroom readers ===
Thunder Bay is also known for publishing The Bathroom Reader and The Ultimate Bathroom Reader.
