= Juneau Monument =

Artwork by Richard Henry Park

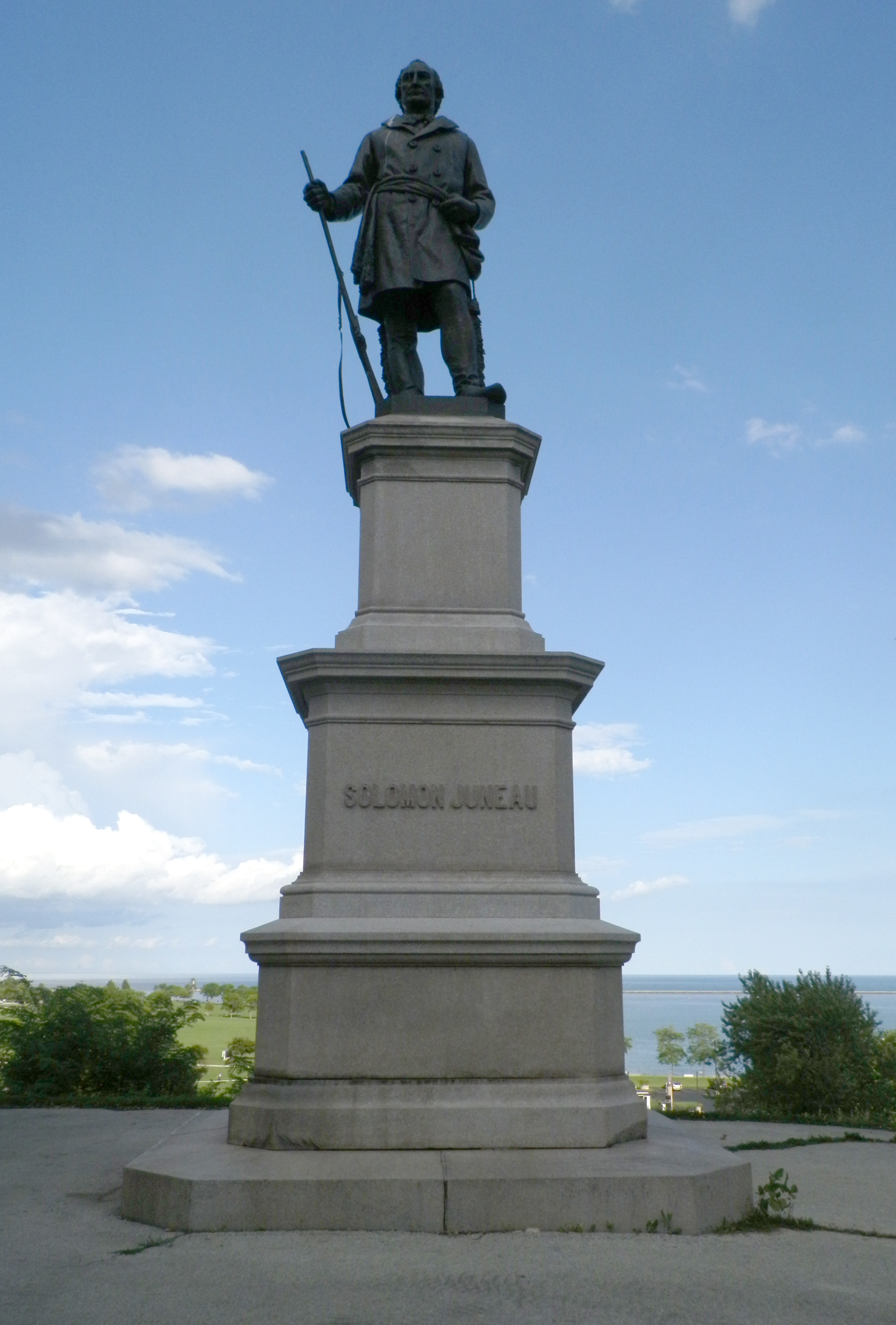
- Artist: Richard Henry Park
- Year: 1887
- Type: Bronze
- Dimensions: 460 cm × 150 cm (180 in × 60 in)
- Location: Juneau Park, Milwaukee; 43°2′34.097″N 87°53′53.766″W

The Juneau Monument is a public artwork by American artist Richard Henry Park located on the grounds of Juneau Park, which is in Milwaukee, Wisconsin. The base of the statue is made of limestone. On top of the base is a bronze statue of Solomon Juneau. On each side of the base are bronze reliefs. The statue is 5 feet (1.5 m) wide by 15 feet (4.6 m) high.

== Description ==
The front of the limestone base is inscribed with the name of the figure depicted in the sculpture, "Solomon Juneau." The back of the base is inscribed, "The gift of Charles T. Bradley, and William H. Metcalf to the City of Milwaukee." On the north side of the base is a bronze relief of Juneau being greeted by Native Americans. Underneath the relief, an inscription reads, "Solomon Juneau, First Mayor of Milwaukee, MDCCCXXXXVI." On the south side of the base is a bronze relief of Juneau being elected to Congress. Underneath the relief is the inscription, "Solomon Juneau, First Mayor of Milwaukee, MDCCCXXXXVI." The memorial statue is 15 by 5 feet (4.6 by 1.5 m) in size. The sculpture was unveiled on July 6, 1887 by Juneau's granddaughter, Hattie White.

== Historical information ==
Solomon Juneau was a French Canadian born in a small village near Montreal, Lower Canada on August 9, 1793. Juneau was a French trader with the American Fur Company. In 1818, the American Fur Company established a trading post in Milwaukee. Juneau decided to purchase the land between the Milwaukee River and Lake Michigan and named it Juneau Town. He was the postmaster and the first president of the Village of Milwaukee. He was elected the first mayor of the City of Milwaukee in 1846. Juneau died in 1856 while making an Indian payment for the U.S. Government at a reservation in Keshena. Shoe manufacturers Charles T. Bradley and William H. Metcalf, friends of the Juneau family, donated the monument as a gift in remembrance of the first mayor of Milwaukee.

Short video of Juneau Monument in Milwaukee
