= Paula Begoun =

American talk show host and author

- Born: Paula Beth Begoun; November 14, 1953 (age 73); Chicago, Illinois, U.S.
- Education: Northern Illinois University
- Occupations: CEO, author, radio host, and talk show personality

Paula Beth Begoun (born November 14, 1953), also known as "The Cosmetics Cop", is an American talk radio host, author, and businesswoman. She is the founder of Paula's Choice and Beginning Press Publishing.

== Career ==
Begoun was born in suburban Chicago, Illinois. As a child, Begoun suffered from acne and eczema. She studied science at Northern Illinois University before moving to Washington D.C. in 1978 to work as a professional makeup artist and esthetician. Begoun then relocated to Washington, and opened her own cosmetics stores in Seattle in 1981, adding a business partner a short time later. In 1982, KIRO-TV in Seattle, Washington offered Begoun a consumer/feature reporter position, where she began reporting on the beauty industry as an investigative journalist. At that time she began working on her first book, Blue Eyeshadow Should be Illegal.

Begoun had sold her business shares to her partner in 1984, and at the end of 1985 she self-published Blue Eye Shadow Should Be Illegal. The book gained national attention, and resulted in the first of many appearances for Begoun on The Oprah Winfrey Show. She also began writing a syndicated column titled "Dear Paula," and received thousands of letters from women across the nation asking for specific information on various beauty products. These requests inspired Begoun to write Don't Go to the Cosmetics Counter Without Me. The first edition was published in 1992.

In 2008, Begoun created Beautypedia.com, an online version of Don't Go to the Cosmetics Counter Without Me. The site is a product review database that claims to cover over 45,000 products from more than 300 brands.

In the early 1990s, Begoun began work with a team of cosmetic chemists to develop her own line of cosmetics and skin-care products. She claims that her products offer results based on published, peer-reviewed research, and that her extensive research of the cosmetic industry provided her with the expertise necessary to develop these formulations. In 1995, Begoun began selling her products online. This has led some consumers to question the objectivity of her product reviews. As counter to these concerns, Begoun claims that Paula's Choice is one of the only companies that recommends products other than their own.

Begoun remains a consultant for dermatologists, plastic surgeons, major cosmetics companies, news and industry insiders. She positions herself as an internationally recognized authority and consumer advocate for the cosmetics and hair-care industries, and routinely appears on news and talk shows, including CNN, Oprah, The Dr. Oz Show, and The View.

== Writing ==
Begoun is a self-published author of 18 books on the beauty industry, most notably Don't Go to the Cosmetics Counter Without Me, The Original Beauty Bible and Blue Eyeshadow Should Be Illegal. Her books have received international recognition, have sold nearly three million copies, and have been translated into eight languages.

== Radio show ==
Previously, Begoun has run a podcast with topics centered on cosmetics, skin and hair care. The show also covered current beauty industry news, "myth-busting", best and worst products, and hosts special guests including dermatologists and cosmetic surgeons. Listeners are invited to call in with questions for Begoun or her co-hosts, and each show includes product giveaways to callers. As of 2013, the radio show is on an indefinite hiatus.

== Publications ==
- The Best Places to Kiss in Northern California
- The Best Places to Kiss in Southern California
- The Best Places to Kiss in The Northwest
- The Best Places to Kiss in New York City
- Blue Eyeshadow Should Be Illegal (1985)
- Blue Eyeshadow Should Absolutely Be Illegal (1991)
- The Beauty Bible (1997)
- The Complete Beauty Bible (2004)
- The Original Beauty Bible: Skin Care Facts for Ageless Beauty (2009)
- Don't Go Shopping for Hair Care Products Without Me (1st edition 1995; final edition 2004)
- Don't Go to the Cosmetics Counter Without Me (1st Edition, 1991; currently in its 9th edition, 2012)
- The Best Skin of Your Life Starts Here: Busting Beauty Myths so You Know What to Use And Why (2015)
- 40 Beauty Myths Busted: What Really Works for Clear, Younger-Looking Skin (2018)
