= Baker & Taylor =

American book distributor

- Founded: 1828; 198 years ago
- Defunct: April 2026; 5 months ago (Chapter 11 bankruptcy liquidation)
- Country of origin: United States
- Headquarters location: Charlotte, North Carolina
- Key people: Amandeep Kochar - President & CEO; Steve Hennen - Chief Financial Officer
- Owner: Amandeep Kochar
- Official website: www.baker-taylor.com

Baker & Taylor was a distributor of books to public and academic libraries and schools. It was based in Charlotte, North Carolina and was owned by President & CEO Amandeep Kochar at the time of its shuttering in 2025. Before being acquired by Follett in 2016, Baker & Taylor had $2.26 billion in sales, employed 3,750, and was #204 on Forbes list of privately owned companies in 2008.

On October 6, 2025, it was announced that Baker & Taylor would begin shutting down operations, with full closure of the company by the beginning of 2026.

== Offerings ==
Baker & Taylor's core business unit focused on sales/distribution of physical books. Retail entertainment product sales ended in January 2019 as a result of a sale of the entertainment products division to La Vergne, TN's Ingram Entertainment. They also added digital book content sales to libraries and offer collection development and processing services to public libraries throughout the world (USA mainly). In May 2019, Follet announced B&T will end distribution to the retail market to better align with Follet and focus on community and education. Digital book content was available through the company's Axis 360 platform via the Axis360 app, which allowed libraries to license copies of a book to expand availability to online borrowers. Prior to the sale of the entertainment products division, its retail unit distributed fewer than one million book titles and previously sold non-core business materials: music CDs, DVDs, and Blu-ray discs to a declining number of brick and mortar retailers, Internet sites, booksellers, craft stores, department stores and several comic book retailers.

In June 2018, B&T announced an alignment with the for-profit school, PA's Penn Foster to provide working adults with skills development and training programs free via their local public library, planning to make Penn Foster’s library of "competency-based, career-aligned courses and playlists, including foundational career readiness skills, soft skills, and degree and certificate programs," available to public library patrons.

== Ownership history ==
In 1828, the business was founded by David Robinson and B. B. Barber as a small bindery and subscription book publisher in Hartford, Connecticut. In 1885, James S. Baker and Nelson Taylor purchased the company.

In July 2006, Castle Harlan Partners was Baker & Taylor's majority owner, having acquired it from the investment firm Willis Stein & Partners. In 1994, the Follett Corporation of River Grove, Illinois had intended to acquire Baker & Taylor from the then majority holder, the Carlyle Group, which was looking to sell its interest to concentrate on the defense industry.

On May 23, 2007, Arnie Wight became president of the company. Jack Eugster became chairman and chief executive officer, replacing Richard Willis, on January 4, 2008. Thomas Morgan took over the CEO role on July 7, 2008. In January 2014, former Brodart Books exec George Coe replaced both Wight and Morgan as president and CEO. In April 2017, after only two months as Follett/B&T CEO/Pres., George Coe departed the company. Follett then appointed former retail exec (Lechters, Barnes & Noble), NJ office based David Cully as president of B&T. Mr Coe rejoined the Brodart company in January 2020, as president & CEO

After only two years in charge, David Cully announced on his retirement from B&T in June 2019. Amandeep Kochar has been promoted to executive vice president of B&T, leading the company after Cully's exit.

In February 2015, Baker & Taylor's publishing group and U.S. marketing services were acquired by Readerlink Distribution Services. Under the acquisition agreement, Readerlink took over ownership of the firm's 504,000 sq. ft. Indianapolis distribution center, as well as their general offices in San Diego and editorial offices in Ashland, Oregon. Baker and Taylor (UK) and B&T (Mexico) were not included in the acquisition, and will remain subsidiaries of Baker & Taylor. A Readerlink spokesperson said no offices, distribution centers, or operational changes were planned, and indicated that all current management and employees of the acquired divisions were joining the Readerlink.

In April 2016, B&T was acquired by the Follett Corporation of McHenry, Illinois. According to The Chicago Tribune, the deal may boost the privately held Follett’s annual revenue by as much as 40 percent—from $2.6 billion to $3.6 billion. and resulted in senior management changes at B&T.

In December 2018, it was reported that Ingram Content extended an offer in November 2018 to purchase Baker & Taylor's retail wholesale business from Follett. As a result, the Federal Trade Commission (FTC), started a preliminary investigation. The FTC contacted leading book retailers, Amazon, major and independent book publishers to help determine the impact, if any, from the sale.

In November 2021, Follett Corporation announced a change in ownership of the Baker & Taylor division, which was divested to a private investment group led by Baker & Taylor President and CEO, Aman Kochar.

On September 11, 2025, it was announced that ReaderLink had agreed to acquire B&T and its assets, including Baker & Taylor Distribution Services, with the deal scheduled to close on September 26. The deal did not include B&T's outstanding financial obligations (including balances owed to multiple publishing companies). On the afternoon of September 26, the day of the expected closing, it was announced that the two sides had "mutually agreed" to call off the acquisition.

On October 6, 2025, it was announced that the company would be winding down operations and would shut down by the beginning of 2026. As a result of the shutdown, it was planned that Boundless, an e-book service owned by Baker & Taylor and used by many US libraries, would go offline on December 8, 2025.

In March 2026, Baker & Taylor filed for Chapter 11 bankruptcy protection in an effort to wind down its assets. The filing revealed that the company had over $100 million in liabilities, primarily caused by the aftermath of the COVID-19 pandemic.

== Lawsuits ==
In 1999, Baker & Taylor paid a settlement of $3 million USD to the U.S. government to settle a federal lawsuit. The suit claimed that Baker & Taylor had overcharged the federal government, as well as state and local libraries using federal funds. These charges occurred after 1992, when Baker & Taylor was sold by its then-parent company, W. R. Grace and Company. Baker & Taylor denied all allegations. Baker & Taylor and its former parent company W. R. Grace agreed August 2 to pay $15.5 million to settle allegations that they overcharged schools and libraries in 18 states for books over more than 10 years. B&T, after spending five years in litigation with the U.S. government over an alleged violation of the False Claims Act, settled with the Department of Justice in July 1999 in return for release from all federal civil liability.

B&T has had other legal problems, notably U.S. District Court for the Northern District of Illinois entered on July 10, 2013 a consent decree resolving a lawsuit brought by the U.S. Equal Employment Opportunity Commission (EEOC).

== Divisions ==
In 2009, Baker & Taylor bought the North American arm of Blackwell UK as well as Blackwell's Australian library supplier, James Bennett. In return, Blackwell acquired the UK-based Lindsay and Croft from Baker & Taylor. Blackwell's North American division was merged into Baker & Taylor's YBP Library Services.

Baker & Taylor sold two business divisions in 2/2015, YBP Library Services (YBP) was acquired by EBSCO Publishing, Inc. and Baker & Taylor Marketing Services' U.S.-based warehouse club business (BTMS US) and Baker & Taylor Publishing Group (BTPG) were acquired by Readerlink Distribution Services, LLC. Sales terms were not disclosed. "These transactions allow Baker & Taylor to focus on our core business (Adult print materials) and new opportunities within those businesses and markets," said George Coe, then CEO of Baker & Taylor.

On January 11, 2019 B&T sold its retail entertainment products division to Ingram Entertainment Inc, of La Vergne, TN. Ingram is the leading distributor of physical home entertainment products. The sale included retail customer agreements for video and audio music products (DVD, BD, Vinyl & Music CD). Terms were not disclosed. Entertainment department staff layoffs were announced internally with affected employees departing by the end of April 2019.

After their unsuccessful sale to Ingram Content, Follett announced in May 2019 the summer '19 closure of B&T's Bridgewater, NJ and Reno, NV warehouses (500+ to be laid off) and the end of product sales and services to the retail market. In February 2020 they moved their remaining NJ office staff to 501 Rt 22 West in Bridgewater, NJ.

== See also ==
- List of book distributors
