= Elizabeth Plankinton =

American philanthropist (1853–1923)

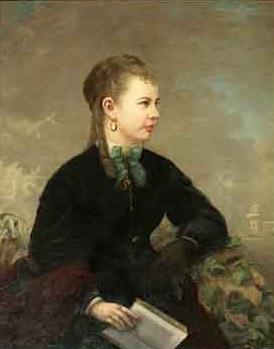
- Portrait, c. 1891
- Born: Elizabeth Anne Plankinton; July 27, 1853; Milwaukee, Wisconsin, U.S.
- Died: 1923 (aged 69–70); Lucerne, Switzerland
- Father: John Plankinton
- Relatives: William Plankinton (brother); Hannah M. Plankinton (sister)

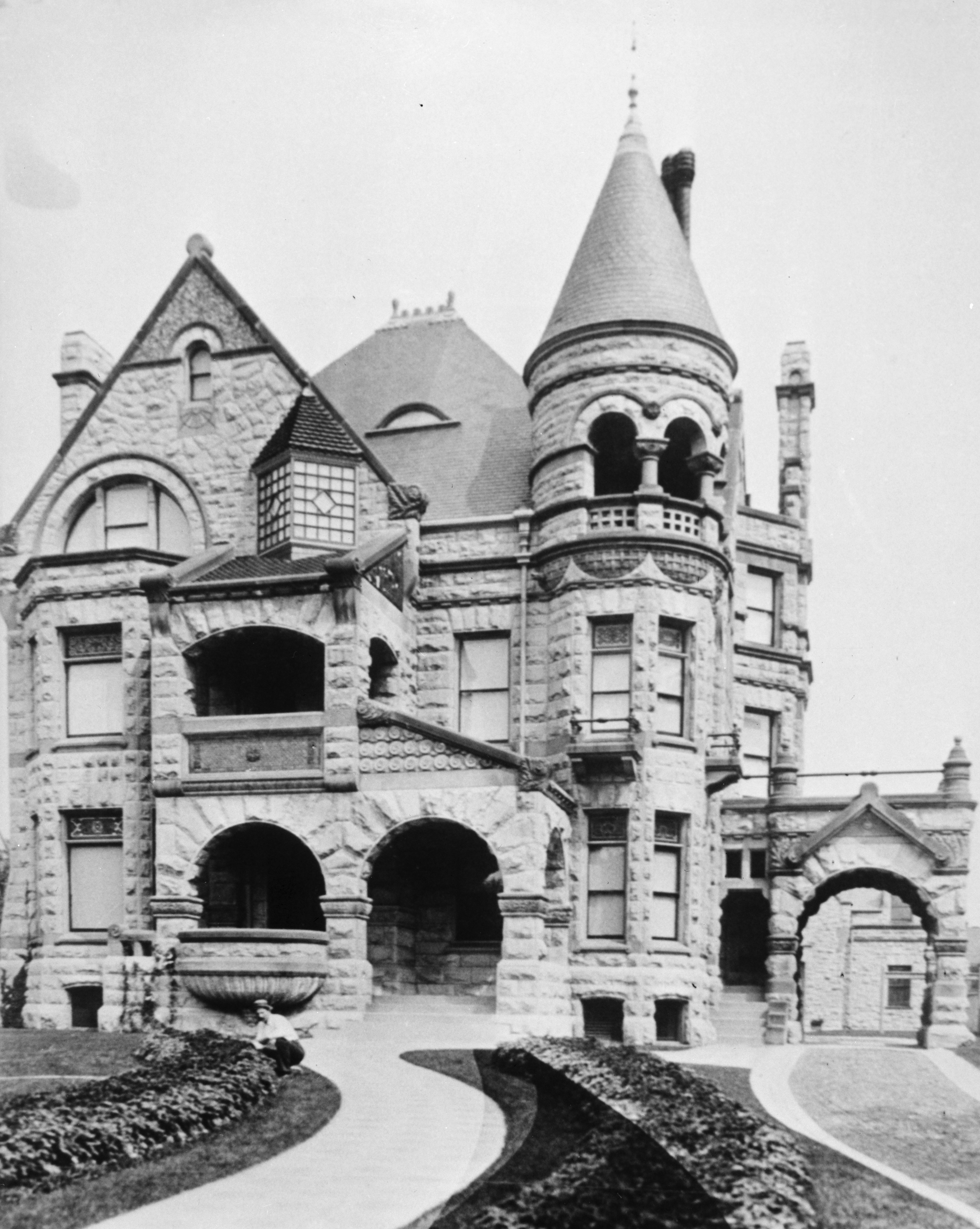
Elizabeth Plankinton House
constructed 1886–1887

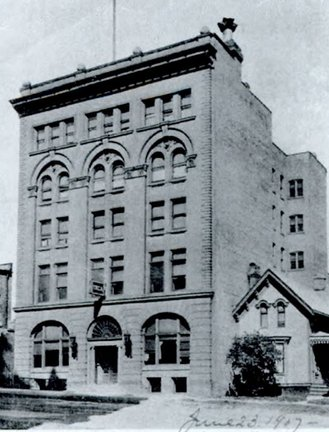
First city YWCA building
donated by Plankinton, 1899

Elizabeth Ann or Anne Plankinton (July 27, 1853 – 1923) was an American philanthropist in the early 20th century, the daughter of Milwaukee businessman John Plankinton. She was also known as "Miss Lizzie" and the people of Milwaukee called Plankinton the "municipal patroness" because of her generosity. She made a large donation that built the first YWCA in Milwaukee. She also purchased an elaborate large-scale pipe organ for the newly constructed city auditorium.

She supported local artists and artisans. One of her notable gifts was the 1885 statue of George Washington that was ultimately placed in Milwaukee's Monument Square. It is 9 ft (2.7 m) tall and sits on a 12 ft (3.7 m) base. This was the first piece of public art for the city and was sculpted by her fiancé.

Plankinton had a three-bedroom mansion built for her in an upscale Milwaukee neighborhood as a wedding gift from her father. Her fiancé abandoned her for a dancer from Minneapolis. Distraught, Plankinton lost interest in the mansion. It stood empty for a decade and was eventually purchased by a widow.

== Biography ==
Plankinton was born in Milwaukee, Wisconsin, on July 27, 1853. She was a daughter of John Plankinton and Elizabeth Brasker (some records show Bracken or Brucken). Her older brother, William, was born in 1844 and her sister, Hannah, in 1851; Hannah died of a heart condition in 1870 when Plankinton was seventeen.

== Elizabeth Plankinton House ==
The Elizabeth Plankinton House was a three-bedroom mansion in the upscale Milwaukee neighborhood of west Grand Ave that was built by businessman and millionaire John Plankinton and was listed in the National Register of Historic Places. It was constructed in 1886–87 at a cost of $100,000 (equivalent to $3.1 million in 2024). and was located across the street from his own palatial residence. His daughter, Elizabeth, was engaged to marry American sculptor Richard Henry Park, and he built the house to give to her as a wedding gift. The marriage never took place, as on September 18, 1887, Park abandoned Elizabeth and married a dancer from Minneapolis instead. Distraught, Elizabeth completely lost interest in the mansion, rejecting her wedding gift and never living in the residence which bore her name; instead, she travelled the world. The mansion stood empty for nearly ten years before eventually being sold to a widow in 1896, who lived in it to 1904. It was resold by her family in 1910 to the Knights of Columbus, who continued to occupy and use it until 1978. It was acquired by the Milwaukee redevelopment authority in 1967, then transferred to Marquette University in 1975.

The house provoked strong feelings at that time, with local historian H. Russell Zimmermann arguing for its preservation on historic grounds, in which he was supported by an analysis by the Historic American Buildings Survey (HABS). However, local opinions included that it was an "eyesore," an "ugly behemoth," and a "monument to Victorian bad taste," and it was entirely surrounded by university buildings by 1980. A representative of Marquette University declared that the "mansion is neither historical nor architecturally significant. It is the product of the whims of the owner and the architect, and does not represent a true example of any particular style of architecture." The university demolished it in October 1980 to make room for student facilities; this occurred approximately two months after the HABS survey report has been issued, and despite the House having been listed on the National Register of Historic Places in 1976. Its destruction was a significant factor in the 1981 formation of the City of Milwaukee Historic Preservation Commission, an appointed city commission created with the aim of protecting Milwaukee's architectural heritage.

== Philanthropy ==
Plankinton followed in her father's footsteps as a humanitarian and was affectionately called "Miss Lizzie" by the citizens of Milwaukee. She continued the tradition of philanthropy and historical records show that Miss Plankinton gave many gifts to the citizens of Milwaukee for their benefit. Out of respect, she was referred to as the "municipal patroness" because of her spirit of giving. One of her public gifts was a $100,000 donation (equivalent to $3.1 million in 2024) in 1892 that ultimately built in 1899 the first YWCA hotel of the city (pictured) for affordable housing for working women. She also purchased a $10,000 pipe organ (equivalent to $0.2 million in 2024) for the then-new half million dollar 1909 Milwaukee Auditorium.

=== Milwaukee Washington monument ===
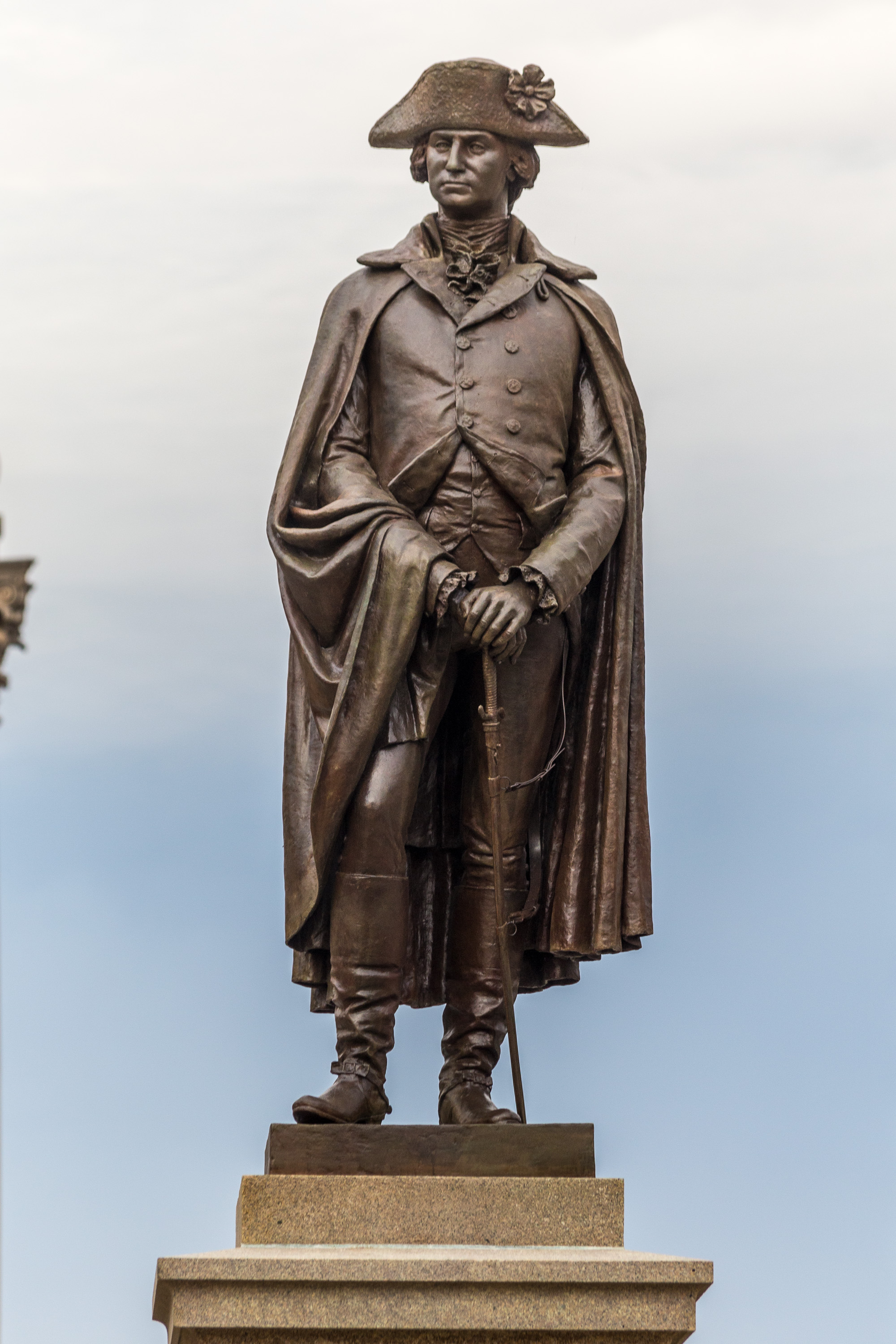
Washington statue

Plankinton's most notable gift was a George Washington bronze statue for the city of Milwaukee, first announced in January 1885. Sculpted by 47 year old Park and dedicated in November 1885, it was the first piece of public art in Milwaukee, and cost around $20,000 (equivalent to $598,000 in 2024). George Washington is portrayed in uniform as the 43-year-old commander-in-chief of the Continental Army, and stands 9 feet 2 inches (2.79 m) tall on a 12 feet 1 inch (3.68 m) granite base. The complete statue assembly with its 12-foot pedestal sits on a Wauwatosa limestone foundation that is 13.5 feet (4.1 m) square and 7 feet (2.1 m) deep consisting of 4 steps.

Inscriptions on the sculpture include: on the lower left side, "RH PARK SC," acknowledging the sculptor (who was Plankinton's then-fiancé); on back of the base, "The Gift of / Elizabeth A. Plankinton / To the City of Milwaukee / 1885"; and, on the front of the base, simply "WASHINGTON". At the foot of statue are two bronze figures, a mother and a child, which were included following a specific request from Plankinton. At a time when immigrants were coming in large numbers to live in Milwaukee, their inclusion is intended to portray a mother showing her child the father of the United States as a message on the importance of history or education.

In 2016–2018, the statue was extensively restored.

== Later life ==
Some time before World War I, Plankinton built a large home in Dresden, Germany, where she spent several months of the year. She was trapped there when the war broke out, and the government impounded her property in the United States. She visited Milwaukee after the war, but was in Europe as her health deteriorated, and she died in Lucerne in Switzerland in 1923. She was buried in the Forest Home Cemetery in Milwaukee, with her mother, father, step mother, brother, and sister, near the Plankinton family obelisk erected after her father's death. In her will, she left considerable bequests to the people of Milwaukee, including $50,000 (equivalent to $0.7 million in 2024) each to the YWCA, the Milwaukee Hospital, and the Milwaukee-Downer College, to whom she had already endowed $65,000 shortly before her death. After her father's death, Plankinton commissioned artist Susan Frackelton and her daughter, Gladys Frackelton Seely, to prepare and illustrate a hand-illuminated volume, Voices of Friends (also known as the Plankinton memorial book), with reminiscences of him from his personal friends, "who knew and loved him well." It was displayed at the Layton Art Gallery, to whom Plankinton bequeathed $25,000 in her will. The gallery has since closed, but the volume has become a part of the rare books collection of the Milwaukee Central Library.

Plankinton's share of her father's estate was held in trust for her children, and as she never had a child, her share went to her nephew, William Woods Plankinton.

== Sources ==
- Austin, H. Russell (1946). The Milwaukee story: The making of an American city. The Milwaukee Journal. OCLC 493061895.
- Hampton (October 1909). "Personalities". Hampton's Magazine. 23. Broadway Magazine, Incorporated: 117–124. OCLC 4918892.
- MCHS (1973). Historical Messenger of the Milwaukee County Historical Society. Vol. 29–32. Milwaukee County Historical Society. OCLC 1713850.
- Mirror (1909). The World Mirror. OCLC 222964669.
- Still, Bayrd (1948). Milwaukee – the History of a City. The State Historical Society of Wisconsin. OCLC 39506240.
- Widen, Larry (2007). Entertainment in Early Milwaukee. Arcadia Publishing. ISBN 978-0-7385-5099-2.
