= Central Library (Milwaukee) =

Public library in Milwaukee, Wisconsin, U.S.

- U.S. National Register of Historic Places
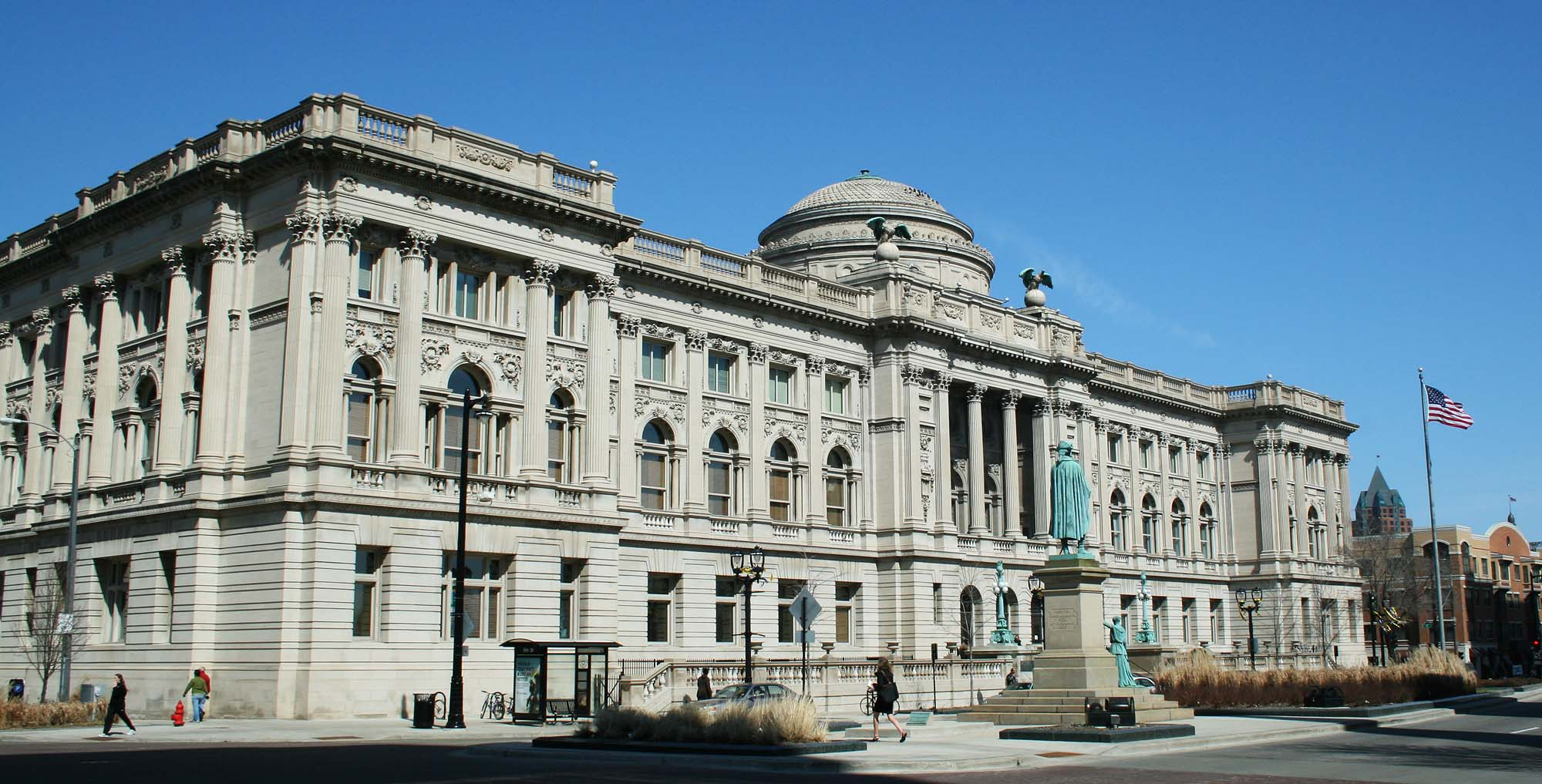
- Milwaukee Central Library
- Location: 814 W. Wisconsin Ave., Milwaukee, Wisconsin, U.S.
- Coordinates: 43°2′22″N 87°55′21″W
- Built: 1895
- Architects: Ferry & Clas
- Architectural style: Renaissance, Renaissance Revival
- NRHP reference No.: 74000101
- Added to NRHP: December 30, 1974

The Central Library is the main branch of and headquarters for the Milwaukee Public Library System as well as for the Milwaukee County Federated Library System. Designated a Milwaukee Landmark in 1969, the building remains one of Milwaukee's most monumental public structures.

Today, the Central Library occupies almost the entire building with 3 exceptions: the headquarters for the Milwaukee County Federated Library System; the Wisconsin Talking Book and Braille Library; and Audio & Braille Literacy Enhancement.

== Central Library architecture ==
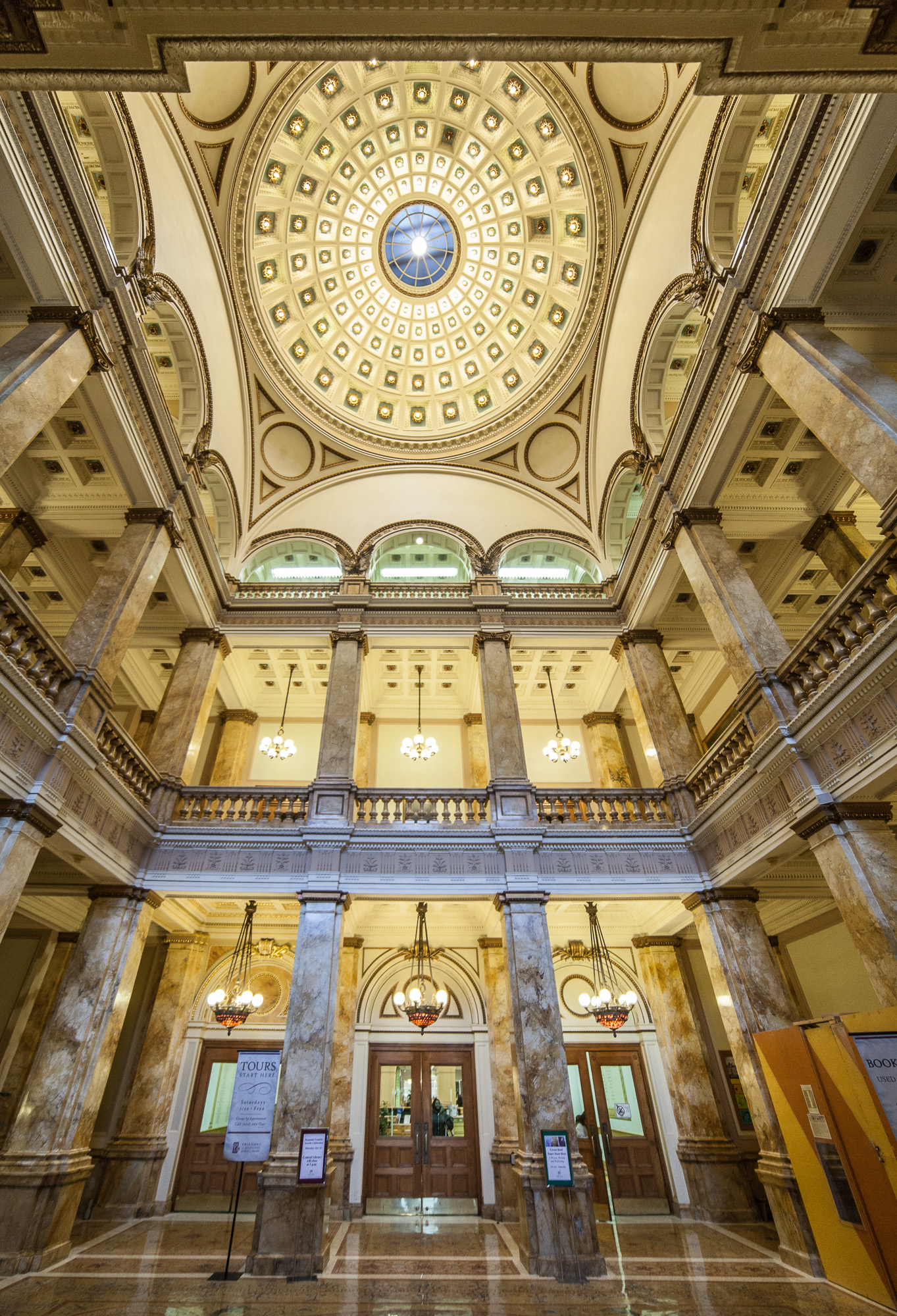
Lobby and ceiling

A national competition was held in 1893 to pick a design for a building to house both the public library and the public museum. Seventy-four entries were received, including one from Frank Lloyd Wright. The winning design submitted by Ferry & Clas of Milwaukee was for a building one block long and designed in a combination of French and Italian renaissance styles known as Neo-Renaissance. The south facade's colonnade over a base may have been inspired by the east front of the Louvre in Paris. The building was designed in a U-shape to provide a common entrance for the library and museum but to keep the facilities separate. Construction costs for the monumental building, now listed on the National Register of Historic Places, were $780,000.

In the entrance to the library, mosaic tile floors were hand-laid by master Italian craftsmen who had settled in Milwaukee. Tessera, the small squarish pieces of colored marble or tile, were used in the entrance and in the Art, Music and Recreation Department. The tessera in the entrance floor are smaller than normal, allowing for a more detailed design. Over the years, the building has settled, cracking and damaging the floor and columns. In 2008, a restoration of the mosaic tile floors was begun. Some of the materials used in the interior are yellow Sienna marble, brass and stained glass (lighting fixtures), hardwoods such as oak and mahogany, and scagliola (used for the pillars). The trim on top of the wainscoting in the corridor is called "egg and dart", and is replicated in renovated areas throughout the library. The bay leaf garland design found above the doors in the corridor is actually made of painted plaster, not carved wood.

In 1936, as a part of the New Deal, Works Progress Administration laborers assisted in the complete overhaul of the library, from redecorating to repairing the mosaic floors to installing a new lighting system and restoring parts of the study and research collections.

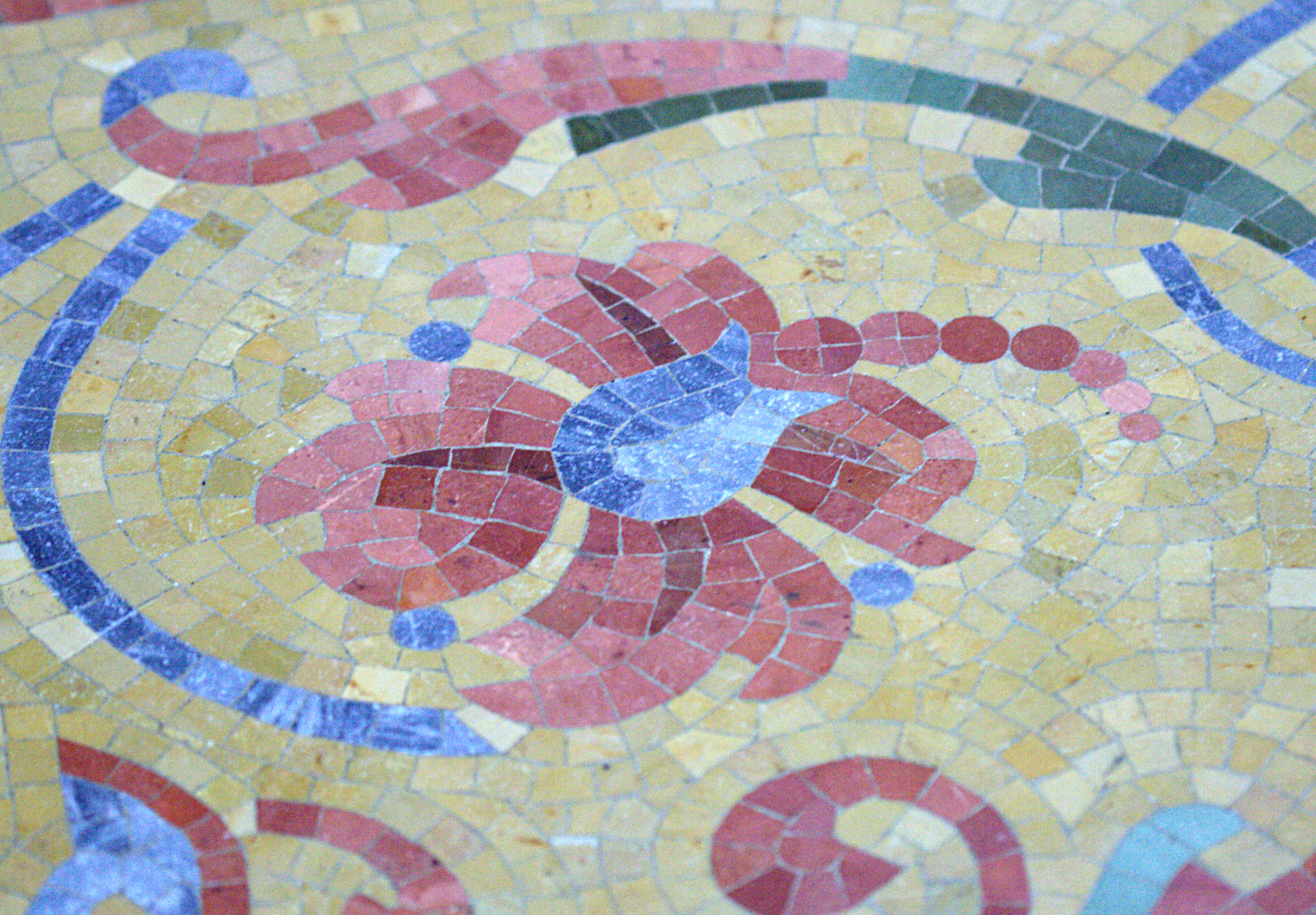
Mosaic tile floors of the Central Library

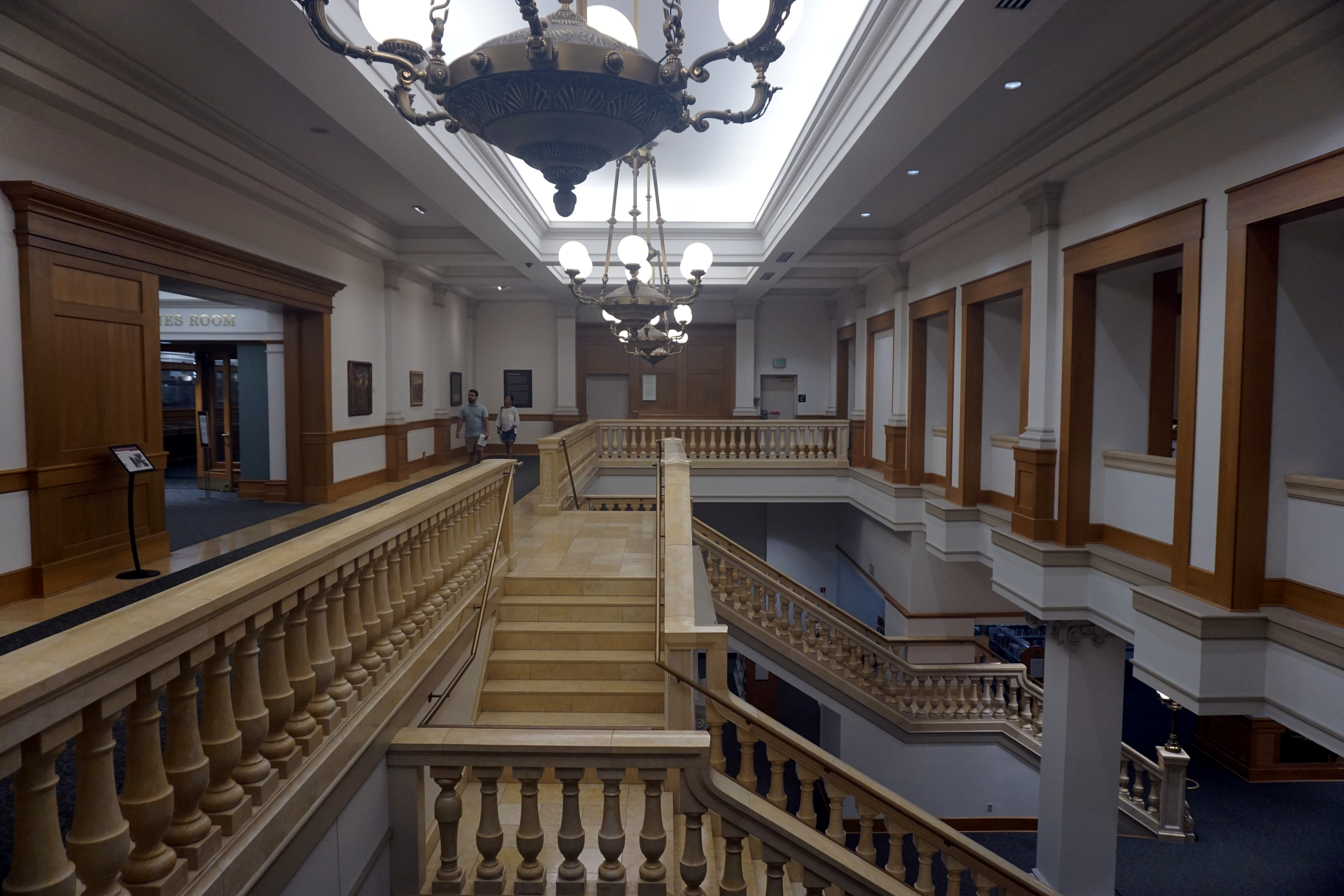
Interior of Central Library

=== Green Roof Project ===
In 2009, the Milwaukee Metropolitan Sewerage District approved additional funding for the Milwaukee Public Library to construct a green roof, replacing the roof built in 1986. The green roof uses a watertight membrane, protective layer, insulation, a filter layer, soil and vegetation to create a roof system. In addition, photovoltaic cells have been installed to convert solar energy into direct current electricity. The green roof is expected to reduce polluted stormwater runoff, urban heat islands, and improve air quality. In the long term, Milwaukee is expected to benefit from reduced costs for water treatment systems and infrastructure. Public tours of the green roof are available on a seasonal basis.

=== The Old Board Room and Corridor ===
The Old Board Room is adjacent to the former office of the city librarian, which had a prime location on the Wisconsin Avenue side of the building. The Old Board Room appears much as it did when the building opened in 1898, with the exception of the ceiling lighting fixture, which was installed at a later date. The furniture is hand-carved of maple. The local firm of Ferry & Clas not only designed the building, but produced plans for all the furniture and equipment that went into it. The room was the site of J. Edgar Hoover's office in the TV movie Dillinger.

=== Art, Music and Recreation Department ===
The renovation of the Art, Music and Recreation Department was completed in October 1999. At the entrance to the department is a mosaic floor titled "Unswept Room" by the artist Steven Ferren. The corridor leading to the room includes gallery space.

=== Children's Room ===
The Children's Room was named at the request of an anonymous donor in memory of Elizabeth A. Brinn, a Milwaukee businesswoman and entrepreneur. The room was dedicated on June 8, 1998 after moving from the second floor into first floor space previously used by Discovery World Museum. The floor of navy blue German linoleum was designed by Lois Ehlert. Thirty-one different animal shapes in a variety of colors greet visitors and reappear throughout the room to highlight other areas of interest. The navy blue of the window seat cushions match the floor and are trimmed in the colors of the animals. The painted glass Hans Christian Andersen window was designed by Marie Herndl and was completed in 1896. The window hung in the original children's library at Central and was restored by Conrad Schmidt Studios for the new children's room.

== Collections ==
=== Art, Music and Recreation ===
The Art, Music and Recreation Department contains all of the reference books in the subjects of fine arts, such as painting and sculpture, architecture, art objects and antiques, movies, theater, television, photography, music, sports, recreation, costume, general bibliographies, folklore and UFOs. The department has a collection of popular sheet music reaching back to the start of the 20th century as well as indices to song books in the library's collection. A few song sheets go back as far as the 1850s, well before the Civil War.

The Art, Music and Recreation Department subscribes to catalogs for the auctions held by two major auction houses, Sotheby's in London and Christie's in New York. A collection of identification and price guides on all types of collectibles, such as toys, porcelain, coins, comics, furniture, dolls, glass and others, is available in a separate reference area for patrons to browse through and study. Some other resources in this department are the poster collection, and the Wisconsin Architectural Archives. The Wisconsin Architectural Archive was founded in 1975 by architect Thomas Eschweiler, the grandson of Alexander C. Eschweiler. The archive encompasses over 12,000 items that drawings and plans that "record the talent and design styles of architects who shaped the appearance and history of Wisconsin."

=== Children's ===
The Central Library Betty Brinn Children's room houses the library's collection of popular children's books and provides a distinct space for children and families within the library. The room also has listening stations, the McBeath theater for programs, films, stories and puppet shows and the Herzfeld Activity Center for presentations, computer training, library instruction, arts and crafts, and other library programs. There are 30 computers in the room equipped with programs to support reading, creative writing, math, science, geography and other academic assignments. The children's room also has a complete Newbery Medal and Caldecott Medal reference collections and a reference collection of Wisconsin authors and illustrators.

=== Humanities ===
Librarians at the Humanities Desk provide patrons with reference assistance in the areas of religion, philosophy, psychology, education, law, the military and government, language and literature, travel, history, biography, genealogy and the social sciences. Staff and volunteers all work to acquire, process, organize, retrieve, copy and preserve materials in these subject areas. Some features of the collection are: Local History Collection, Genealogy Collection, the Great Lakes Marine Collection, and Historical Photographs. In addition, the Humanities department provides initial reference service to researchers interested in archival collections, such as the City of Milwaukee Archives, the Milwaukee Road Archives, and the Local History Manuscript Collections.

=== Periodicals ===
This department contains indices published in both paper and online format such as Readers' Guide to Periodical Literature, the Education Index, and EBSCO. This department also has information to aid with finding consumer information, vehicle valuation, stock prices, tax forms, lottery results and directories of publications.

The Milwaukee Public Library is a regional depository library for publications of the federal government. Each year the library is sent thousands of documents at no charge for the purpose of making them available to the public.

=== Richard E. and Lucile Krug Rare Books Room ===
This area consists of two spaces — a reception/program area and an environmentally controlled stack area. The room is named after long time (1941–1975) city librarian Richard Krug, who established the first rare books room in the late 1950s and whose widow, Lucile, generously donated toward the construction and furnishing of this room, which was dedicated in 2001.

Access to the stacks is restricted to staff. Examples of the collection include:

- A complete set of John James Audubon's Birds of America
- The library's oldest printed book, Johannes Nider's "Praeceptorium divinae legis" of 1479, deals with the Ten Commandments. It is bound in wood and has 15th-16th century student notes written in some of the margins.
- Other incunabula, the "Hypnerotomachia Poliphili" or Strife of Love in a Dream, printed in Venice by the famous Aldine Press in 1499, considered to be the most beautiful book of the Renaissance.
- The 60 pound Autograph Book, containing 2,283 autographs and appended sayings or drawings of leading politicians, artists, musicians and intellectuals from c. 1898 America.
- "Voices of Friends"—a 1913 hand illuminated and lettered manuscript by Milwaukee artist Susan Frackelton and her daughter, commissioned by Elizabeth Plankinton in honor of her father, prominent 19th-century businessman, John Plankinton. It took three years for her to complete.
- Autographed letters from Dickens, Beethoven, Liszt, Bismarck, Solomon Juneau, Billy Mitchell.
- 19th century and earlier color plate books on ornithology, botany, Native Americans, fashion.
- Examples of artists' books, foredge paintings, private presses such as Kelmscott, Doves, and Ashendene—which produced beautiful hand made books around 1900.
- The second exemplar (painted ca. 1851) of the three versions of Carl Spitzweg's most famous work "The Bookworm", occupies a special place of honor in this climate-controlled room, only having any light shone on it when there is a Rare Books Room program taking place in order to further preserve it. The donor, Rene Von Schleinitz, gave his collection of German Romantic paintings to the Milwaukee Art Museum, but reserved this one especially for the Milwaukee Public Library. As of 2015 the painting is on permanent loan to the Grohmann Museum at the Milwaukee School of Engineering. The loan agreement entitles MPL cardholders free access to the entire museum collection.

=== Business and Technology ===
The Business and Technology department houses information on science, health and medicine, technology, business information, patents, trademarks, statistics, census materials, industry standards, and military specifications.

Milwaukee Public Library is a patent depository library and houses U.S. patents from 1792 up to the present. The library is also a designated Patent and Trademark Resource Center, conducting regular classes to help the intellectual property needs of the public. There are also resources to conduct patent searches in various formats: print, microfilm cassette, CD-ROMs and DVD-ROMs.
