= Topolewski v. State =

- Court: Wisconsin Supreme Court
- Full case name: Topolewski, Plaintiff in error, v. The State, Defendant in error
- Decided: December 4, 1906
- Citation: 109 N.W. 1037; 130 Wis. 244

Court membership
- Judges sitting: John B. Winslow, Roujet D. Marshall, Joshua Eric Dodge, Robert G. Siebecker, James C. Kerwin
- Chief judge: John B. Cassoday

Case opinions
- Decision by: Marshall

Keywords
- Larceny; Theft; Trespass

Topolewski v. State, 130 Wis. 244, 109 N.W. 1037 (Wis. 1906), is a Wisconsin criminal case involving the trespass element in a staged larceny.

== Background ==
In October 1905, Matt Dolan was employed by Plankinton Packing Company, a pork and beef packing company based in Milwaukee. Dolan also owed John Topolewski over $100. Topolewski demanded Dolan pay him the amount owed, and when Dolan could not pay, Topolewski told Dolan to steal four barrels of meat for him to settle the debt instead by placing the barrels on a company loading dock for Topolewski to pick up as a sham customer without paying. Dolan immediately informed his manager of Topolewski's plan, and the manager placed a watch over the barrels and told Dolan to pretend to go through with the plan. The loading dock platform manager alerted to the plan as well. As agreed, Topolewski arrived, loaded the barrels into his truck, drove off, and was arrested shortly thereafter. No one at the company stopped Topolewski from taking the barrels.

Topolewski was charged for stealing $55.20 worth of Plankinton's meat barrels and found guilty of larceny. Topolewski appealed, was again convicted of larceny, and was sentenced to pay a fine and court fees. Topolewski filed several motions to overturn his conviction and paid the fees under protest to avoid imprisonment.

== Judgment ==
At the time of Topolewski's conviction, the crime of larceny required the offender to commit a trespass. Justice Marshall explained that there was no trespassory taking present because the manager and the platform manager "consented" to Topolewski taking the barrels, the dock transaction constituted a delivery, and Plankinton had essentially delivered the barrels to Topolewski where barrels were usually picked up. Because a party cannot consent to trespass, the company employees' consent to Topolewski taking the barrels from the platform therefore negated an essential element of the crime of larceny.

The lower court's judgment was reversed, and Topolewski's case was remanded for a new trial.

== Significance ==
Topolewski has created discussion about criminal intent for stealing within the ordinary course of business. Legal scholars have concluded the case to suggest that receiving goods in the ordinary course of business with delivery, as Topolewski did when he picked up the barrels from Plankinton, cannot constitute a taking necessary for larceny, no matter his intent.
