= John Plankinton =

American businessman in Milwaukee (1820-1891)

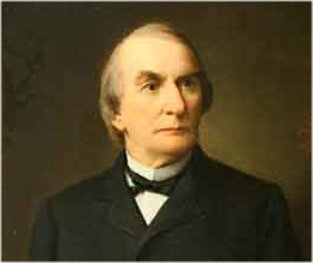
- Plankinton c. 1891
- Born: March 11, 1820; New Castle County, Delaware
- Died: March 29, 1891 (aged 71); Milwaukee, Wisconsin
- Burial place: Forest Home Cemetery
- Occupations: Businessman and industrialist
- Spouse(s): Elizabeth née Brachein (m. 1840 – her death, 1872); Anna Bradford (m. 1875 – his death, 1891)
- Children: William Plankinton (b. Allegheny City, PA, November 7, 1843 – d. March 29, 1905); Hannah M. Plankinton, (b. 1851 – d. 1870); Elizabeth Ann Plankinton (b. Milwaukee, WI, 1853 – d. Lucerne, Switzerland, 1923)

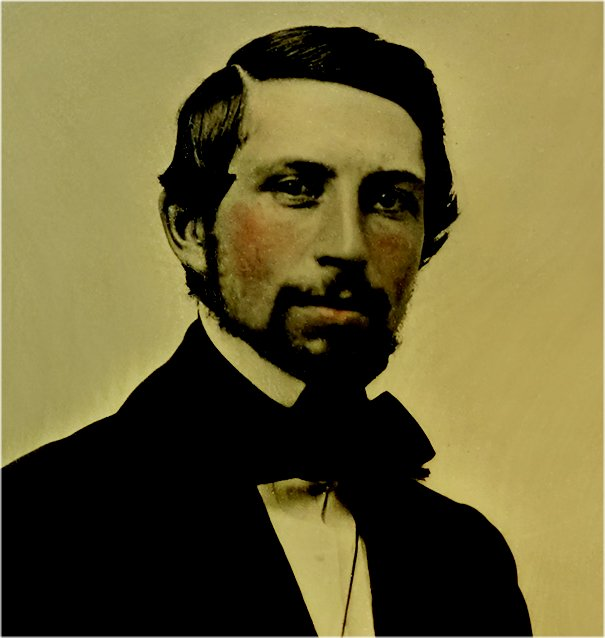
Frederick Layton, 1850

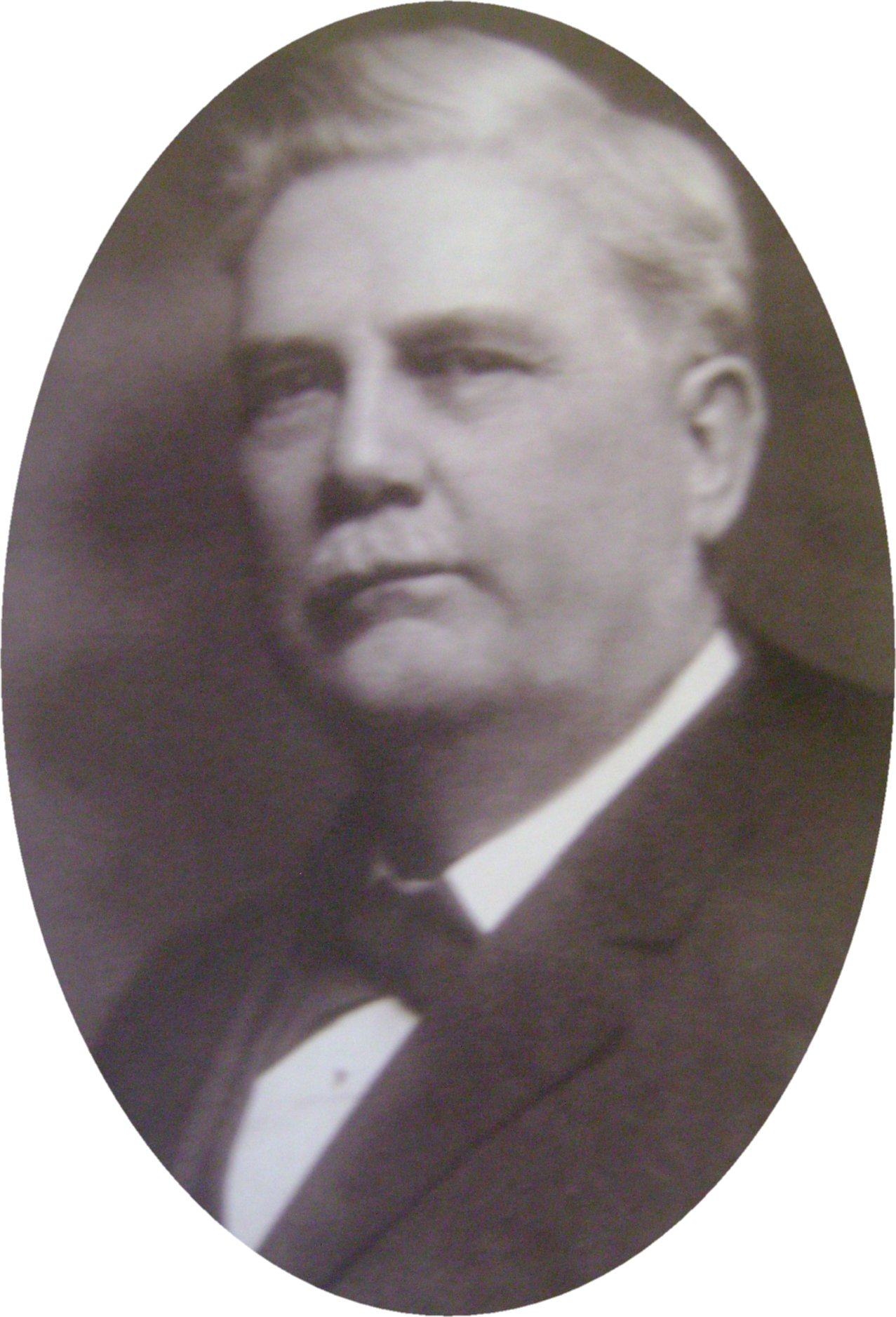
Patrick Cudahy, 1900

John Plankinton (March 11, 1820 – March 29, 1891) was an American businessman. He is noted for expansive real estate developments in Milwaukee, including the luxurious Plankinton House Hotel designed as an upscale residence for the wealthy. He was involved with railroading and banking. The Plankinton Bank he developed became the leading bank of Milwaukee in his lifetime. He was involved in the development of the Milwaukee City Railroad Company, an electric railway.

Plankinton was a Milwaukee-based meatpacking industrialist. He started this trade as a butcher for his general store operating in the center part of the city. He was the city's leading meat packer after his first year in the grocery business. He expanded this industry and eventually became acquainted with the meatpacking industrialist Philip D. Armour forming a company with him that lasted for 20 years.

Plankinton was noted for his generous philanthropy. He donated the land for the construction of the Perseverance Presbyterian church and supported the formation of a soup kitchen in Milwaukee for the poor that included the daily supply of meat needed. He also financed the construction of the first Milwaukee public library.

== Early life ==
Plankinton was born on March 11, 1820, in New Castle County, Delaware, the son of Eli Plankinton and Mary (née Johnson). In 1832, when he was 12 years old, the family moved to Pittsburgh, where he attended public schools and received most of his early formal education. He met his future wife, Elizabeth Brachein, while a teenager in Pittsburgh, and they were married in 1840. His first job was as a butcher, and he pursued this career for some 22 years.

== Mid-life and career ==
Plankinton was 24 years old in 1844 when he moved with his wife and new son (William Plankinton, 1843–1905) to Milwaukee, Wisconsin Territory. He traveled through the Great Lakes from Pittsburgh to Milwaukee on the steamer Great Western. He was going to form a business with a friend who had already moved to Milwaukee prior, but his friend formed a partnership with another person before he arrived using as an excuse that this other person had more money and skills available for the new business he had in mind. Plankinton was disappointed and upset over the lack of confidence, so with his capital of $400 ($13,800 with inflation) he built a general store in opposition and operated it for a few years and lived above the business. In 1849, he began selling beef and hog products from his store that he processed and packaged himself. He became the leading butcher and meat packer in Milwaukee with his first year at $12,000 ($464,000 with inflation) in sales.

Plankinton became acquainted with Frederick Layton around 1850 and formed a business partnership with him a couple of years later. His two daughters, Hannah (1851–1870) and Elizabeth (1853–1923), were born around this time. The meat packing partnership enterprise of 1852 was called Layton and Plankinton Packing Company. Layton retired and left the firm in 1861 to start a meat packing firm of his own. Plankinton continued the Milwaukee business for the next couple of years and in 1864 formed a new enterprise with Philip D. Armour – Plankinton & Armour Company. The newly formed company was fueled by meat demand for the Union Army troops in the American Civil War and thereby became successful. They expanded their facilities by branching out into Chicago and Kansas City. They also had an exporting branch in New York City that operated on a commission basis. The company's sales in 1880 was $15 million ($500,400,000 with inflation). In late 1884, 20 years after they formed their partnership, it was officially broken up. Armour continued with the branch firms in Chicago, Kansas City, and New York City.

Plankinton reorganized his part of the Milwaukee meat packing business and Patrick Cudahy, who had been with him since 1854, became his facility superintendent and a business partner. The firm was known as John Plankinton and Company. Plankinton's poor health became an issue in 1888 and a major portion of his business went to Cudahy and his brother. The Cudahy brothers eventually renamed the meat packing enterprise "Cudahy Brothers Company". They moved the entire facilities in 1893 about 2 miles (3.2 km) from the Milwaukee city limits to a 700-acre (280 ha) parcel of farm land known unofficially as "Porkopolis". It was later named officially as the town of Cudahy, Wisconsin.

== Plankinton House Hotel ==
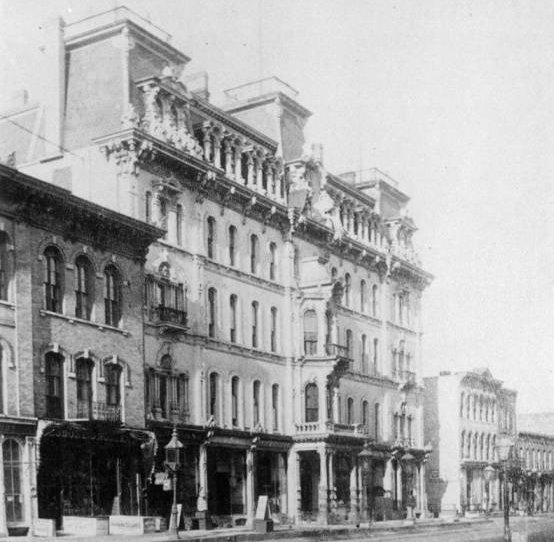
Milwaukee Plankinton House Hotel, when it was built in 1867

When Milwaukee was incorporated as a city in 1846, the American House Hotel in the center of town on Grand Avenue had been operating for three years. This wooden structure was completely burned down on July 4, 1861. Plankinton purchased this strategically located piece of real estate and constructed the Plankinton House Hotel there out of sandstone blocks and brick, chosen because they were fireproof.

The hotel was in the French Renaissance architectural style. It had 400 rooms and could accommodate 600 guests. Built as an upscale hotel intended for business people and the wealthy, its frontage occupied 800 feet (240 m) on Grand Avenue. Inside was an elegant dining room that matched those of the most expensive hotels in the world and could accommodate over 300 people. Late in the 1890s, it was expanded to double the size of the hotel.

Plankinton's luxurious hotel had a mansard roof and was the tallest building in Milwaukee at the end of the 19th century. The location in the center part of the city proved in the long run to be an excellent choice. Transportation in the city improved considerably in the 20th century, with streetcars operating on the avenue where the hotel was located. The hotel and residence remained popular with the well-to-do until it was torn down in 1915, after spanning almost 50 years of existence.

== Associated businesses ==
Plankinton was associated with Frederick Layton and others when in 1865 they took over the River and Lake Shore City Railway Company and incorporated it into the Milwaukee City Railroad Company. He also financed the construction of the first Milwaukee public library in 1882, which at the time was on Grand Avenue between Fourth and Fifth Streets. Plankinton is associated with the founding and financing of the Milwaukee Exposition building that was originally constructed in the city in 1881. He promoted the events that took place in the building.

On February 7, 1887, the Plankinton Bank (thought of as Plankinton's pet project) began operations, established with capital of $200,000, the majority from the bank's President (John Plankinton, $43,500) and Vice President (Frederick T. Day, $63,000). The bank grew into the leading bank in Milwaukee, but was forced to seek new investors following Plankinton's death.

== Family ==
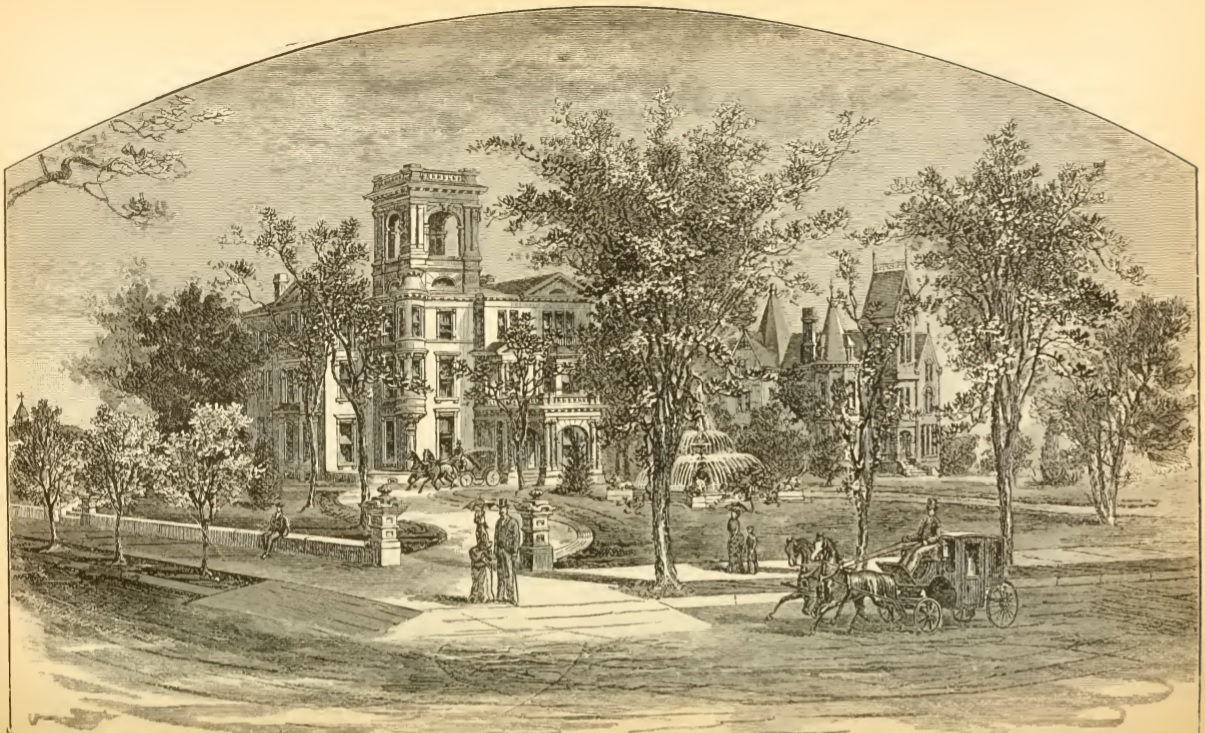
Line drawings of the mansions of John Plankinton (left) and William's (right), that was done by James Smith Buck about 1886

Plankinton was married twice. By his first wife, Elizabeth Brachein of Delaware, he had a son William and two daughters Hannah and Elizabeth Ann. His eldest daughter Hannah died of heart disease at the age of 17. After being widowed, he married his second wife, Anna Bradford (1826–1900), in 1875.

In 1864, Plankinton purchased the James H. Rogers mansion along with its surrounding seven acres that he turned into a parkland. He spent $200,000 (equivalent to $3.3 million in 2024) remodeling the house into the most elegant and expensive residence in Milwaukee. The scale of the value of the property can be inferred from the $5,000 spent to add a carriage barn just after the mansion was completed, as at the time $750 was sufficient to build a country cottage and $7,000 was enough for a major stone-and-brick villa.

In the fall of 1876, work began on the William Plankinton Mansion, a gift from his father following his wedding of William to Mary Ella Woods in April of that year. It was located adjacent to Plankinton's own mansion and was completed in 1876. The architect was Edward Townsend Mix, a respected designer in Milwaukee at the time. The construction supervisor, described as a master mechanic, was Arthur Bates who had built many mansions and handled the renovation of Plankinton's own property. Plankinton also built a mansion for his daughter in 1886–87 at a cost of $150,000 (equivalent to $4.6 million in 2024). after she became engaged to Richard Henry Park. Elizabeth never occupied the house as the wedding was called off after Park married another woman in September 1887. In fact, she only visited the house a single time.

Plankinton's first grandchild was born in 1881, when his son had a son, William Woods Plankinton (1881–1927); Plankinton's will left the bulk of his estate (estimated following his effective retirement for health reasons from the spring of 1889 at between $8 and $10 million (equivalent to $0.3 to $0.3 billion in 2024)) in trust to his grandchildren and in the alternative to the hospital, so the child became the heir to the family fortune. When Elizabeth died childless in 1923, her share went to her nephew.

== Personal life ==
Plankinton was involved with civil activities and was president of the Milwaukee Chamber of Commerce in 1867. He served on the board of directors of several businesses. Besides being on the board at the Plankinton Bank he was a member at the Northwestern Life Insurance Company. He was involved with business affairs of the livestock producers of Wisconsin and northern Illinois by developing a market for their products in Milwaukee. He and his business associates established the meat packing industry of the Midwest.

Plankinton donated two lots for the formation of the First Holland Presbyterian Church, which subsequently became the Perseverance Presbyterian Church. He also supported the formation of a soup kitchen to feed the poor, by providing the building rent-free, along with a generous amount of money, and a daily supply of meat.

Plankinton retired from business in 1889. He died of pneumonia in his home on the evening of March 29, 1891, attended by his family, personal business secretary Jeremiah Quin, and his long-time medical doctor Dr. Thompson. He was buried in the Forest Home Cemetery in Milwaukee and a large granite obelisk was built on the site. Other family members buried there include both of John's wives and all five of his children. A newspaper obituary reads: "Milwaukee today mourns the loss of her foremost citizen, whose generous public spirit and many deeds of benevolence, whose great business ability and modest, upright life are imperishably written on the pages of Milwaukee's history."

== Legacy ==
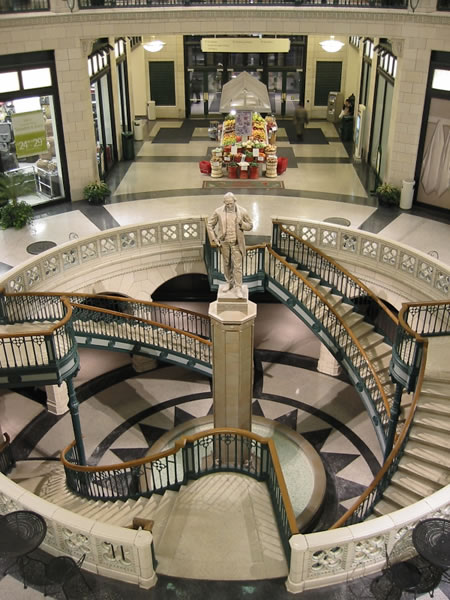
Plankinton statue

A statue in bronze of Plankinton from Park is now located in The Grand's Plankinton Arcade. Elizabeth Plankinton commissioned artist Susan Frackelton to prepare and illustrate a hand-illuminated volume, Voices of Friends (also known as the Plankinton memorial book), with reminiscences of her father from his personal friends, those "who knew and loved him well". It included contributions from Cudahy, Frackelton, Frank Gunsaulus, General Charles King, Layton, and Quin. It was displayed at the Layton Art Gallery, to which Elizabeth bequeathed $25,000 (equivalent to $0.4 million in 2024) in her will. The gallery has since closed, but the volume has become a part of the rare books collection of the Milwaukee Central Library.

The Wisconsin Meat Industry Hall of Fame was initiated in 1993, and Plankinton was one of three new inductees added in 1995. The accompanying profile describes Plankinton as a philanthropist and "A Merchant Prince and Princely Merchant", a title also used in his Milwaukee Sentinel obituary.

== Sources ==
- Ackerman, Sandra (2004). Milwaukee Then and Now. Thunder Bay Press. ISBN 978-1-59223-203-1.
- Austin, H. Russell (1946). The Milwaukee story. The Milwaukee journal.
- Anderson, William John (1892). Milwaukee's Great Industries. Association for the Advancement of Milwaukee.
- Apps, Jerry (August 17, 2015). Wisconsin Agriculture: A History. Wisconsin Historical Society Press. ISBN 978-0-87020-725-9.
- Barton, E.E. (1886). Industrial History of Milwaukee. E.E. Barton.
- Beutner, Jeff (August 19, 2014). "The Plankinton House Hotel, 1869". Urban Milwaukee.
- Bruce, William George (1922). History of Milwaukee, City and County (v.3). S. J. Clarke Publishing Company.
- Buck, James Smith (1876). Pioneer History of Milwaukee:1833-1841. Milwaukee News Company.
- Buck, James Smith (1881). Pioneer History of Milwaukee:1833-1846. William Chester Swain.
- Buck, James Smith (1886). Milwaukee Under the Charter: Volume 4 – From 1854 to 1860 Inclusive. Milwaukee News Company.
- Davis, Stacey Vogel (December 18, 2012). "John Plankinton back at his post at Grand Avenue". Milwaukee Business Journal.
- Gurda, John (1999). The Making of Milwaukee. Milwaukee County Historical Society. ISBN 978-0-938076-14-8.
- Hall, Henry (1896). America's Successful Men. New York tribune.
- Hill, Thomas Edie (1891). Hill Album of Biography. Danks.
- Hintz, Martin (July 29, 2011). A Spirited History of Milwaukee Brews & Booze. Arcadia Publishing Incorporated. ISBN 978-1-61423-389-3.
- "Elizabeth Plankinton House in Milwaukee, Wisconsin". historic-structures.com. November 19, 2009. "."
- Poole (1885). Something Worth Having and Keeping. Poole Bros.
- Romell, Rick (August 15, 2012). "Statue of industrialist John Plankinton to go into storage". Milwaukee Journal Sentinel.
- Still, Bayrd (1948). Milwaukee – the History of a City. The State Historical Society of Wisconsin.
- Usher, Ellis Baker (1914). Wisconsin: Its Story 1848–1913. Lewis publishing Company. p. 1099.
- Wilson, James Grant (1918). Appleton's cyclopædia of American biography. D. Appleton and company.
- "Wisconsin Meat Industry Hall of Fame – 1995". University of Wisconsin–Madison. October 12, 1994. Archived from the original on February 2, 2017.
- "Wisconsin Meat Industry Hall of Fame, 1995 – John Plankinton" (PDF). University of Wisconsin–Madison. 1995. pp. 33–35. Archived from the original (PDF) on February 11, 2022.
- West (1918). The Northwestern Reporter. West Publishing Company.
- "Wisconsin Meat Industry Hall of Fame". University of Wisconsin–Madison. December 19, 2016. Archived from the original on February 2, 2017.
- Yenowine, George H. (April 8, 1887). "John Plankinton / Sketch of the Life and the Home of Milwaukee Millionaire". Burlington Weekly Free Press. Burlington, Vermont – via Newspapers.com.
- Yenowine, George H. (February 27, 1890). "John Plankinton, of Milwaukee, and His Fortune". Jamestown Weekly Alert. Jamestown, North Dakota – via Newspapers.com.
