= William Plankinton Mansion =

House built in 1876[1] by the millionaire meatpacking entrepreneur John Plankinton

Coordinates: 43.038513°N 87.932640°W

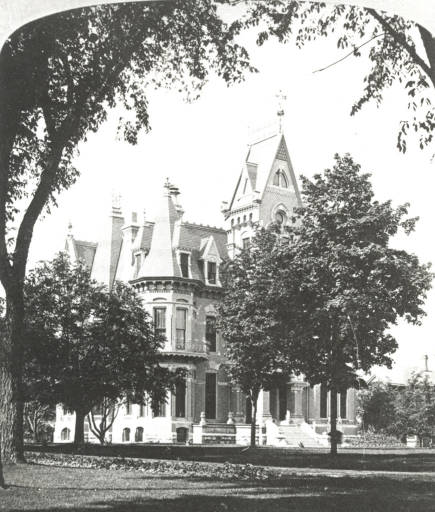
William Plankinton House, 1909

The William Plankinton Mansion (also known as the William Plankinton House) was built in 1876 by the millionaire meatpacking entrepreneur John Plankinton and presented as a wedding gift when his son William Plankinton married Mary Ella Woods. Located at 1529 W. Wisconsin Avenue in Milwaukee, Wisconsin, the Victorian style residence was designed by Edward Townsend Mix, the most prominent Milwaukee architect of that era.

One of the mansion's notable ornaments was a lion's head on its external marble-faced construction. The interior featured ornate woodwork, and the stairwell was illuminated by a stained glass window. The building was sold in 1918 to Marquette University and for decades served as a hospital annex. In 1969 it was demolished to make way for new university structures.

== Construction and usage ==
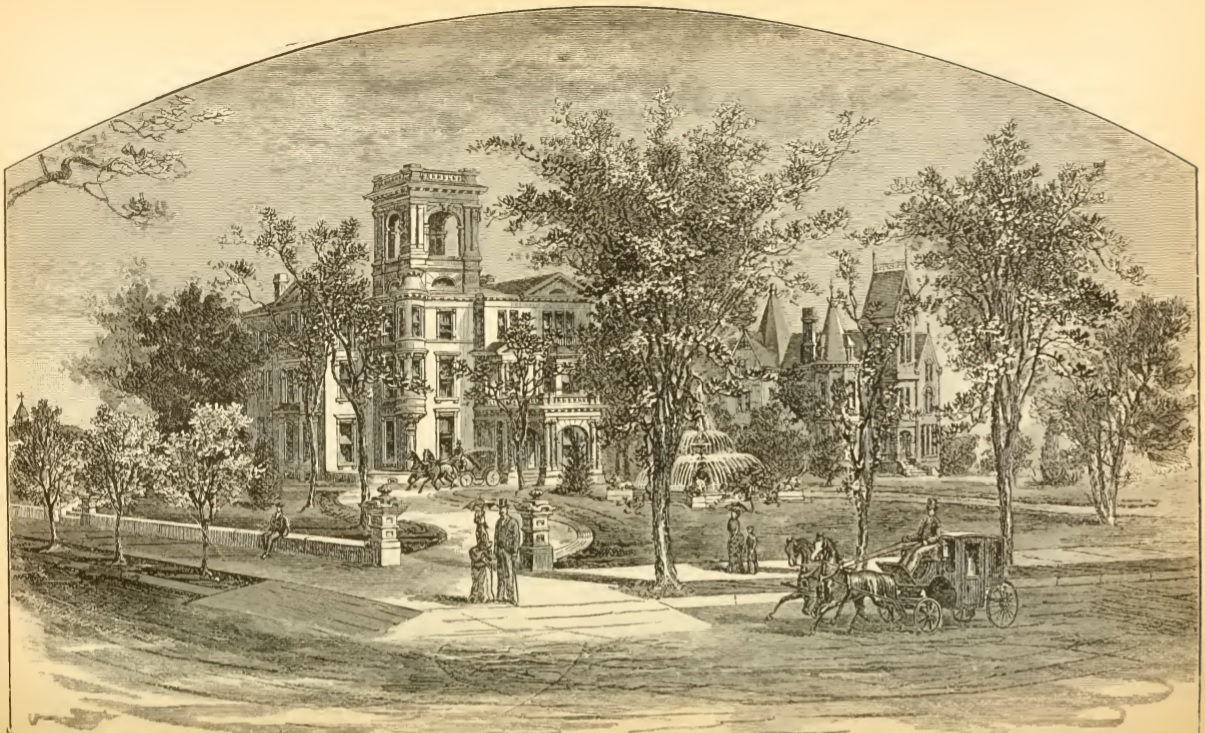
Mansions of John Plankinton (left) and his son William (1886)

Wisconsin Avenue was originally named Spring Street, but after several mansions were built along the street, it developed into the most prestigious residential area for the wealthy and in 1876 was renamed Grand Avenue. Known as "A Merchant Prince and Princely Merchant" for his philanthropy, John Plankinton owned property between Fifteenth and Sixteenth Streets on Grand Avenue and here financed three residences: one for himself (the extensively remodeled James Rogers mansion at 625 N. Fifteenth Street along with its surrounding seven acres of parkland, purchased in 1865); one immediately next door, to the east, for his son William and built in 1876; and one across the street for his daughter Elizabeth built in 1886-88 (at 1492 W. Wisconsin Avenue). Elizabeth never moved into her residence, and after William Plankinton died in 1905, his descendants moved to another location, since the neighborhood had undergone decline and Grand Avenue was no longer regarded as the city's most prestigious address. Following discussions that began in 1913, it was finally renamed W. Wisconsin Avenue in 1926.

While the Elizabeth Plankinton House was sold in 1910 to the Knights of Columbus and used for club gatherings and events, the William Plankinton Mansion and other associated Plankinton real estate of several acres were purchased by Marquette University in 1918. The Plankinton family sold the property under the condition that the mansions on it were to be demolished by 1920. A legal loophole to this clause was found, and the mansions were temporarily saved.

The William Plankinton Mansion was remodeled to a hospital facility during 1919 and became the Trinity Hospital Annex by 1920. It had a capacity of 42 patients and was an extension of the Trinity Hospital of Milwaukee, which had a capacity of 106 patients needing more intensive treatment. The annex served both as an eye, ear, nose and throat clinic and as a nurses' training hospital providing rehabilitative care to convalescing patients who were transferred from the main Trinity hospital. After the structure was no longer used as a hospital annex, it was repurposed in 1953 as Marquette's Alumni and Athletic Office.

== Demolition ==
The William Plankinton Mansion was demolished in 1969 to make way for new university facilities constructed in the 1970s. In 1975, the John Plankinton Mansion located next door to the site of the William Plankinton Mansion was likewise demolished. Finally, the Elizabeth Plankinton House was demolished in 1980 and removed under much protest, leading to the formation of the City of Milwaukee Historic Preservation Commission in 1981, with the aim of protecting Milwaukee's architectural heritage.

== Sources ==
- Marquette University (1919). Announcements and Catalogue. Marquette University.
- DOI, U.S. Department of the Interior (1979). The National Register of Historic Places. United States government printing office.
- Wisconsin, State (1919). Wisconsin Medical Journal. State Medical Society of Wisconsin.
