= Elizabeth Plankinton House =

Stone structure in Milwaukee, Wisconsin

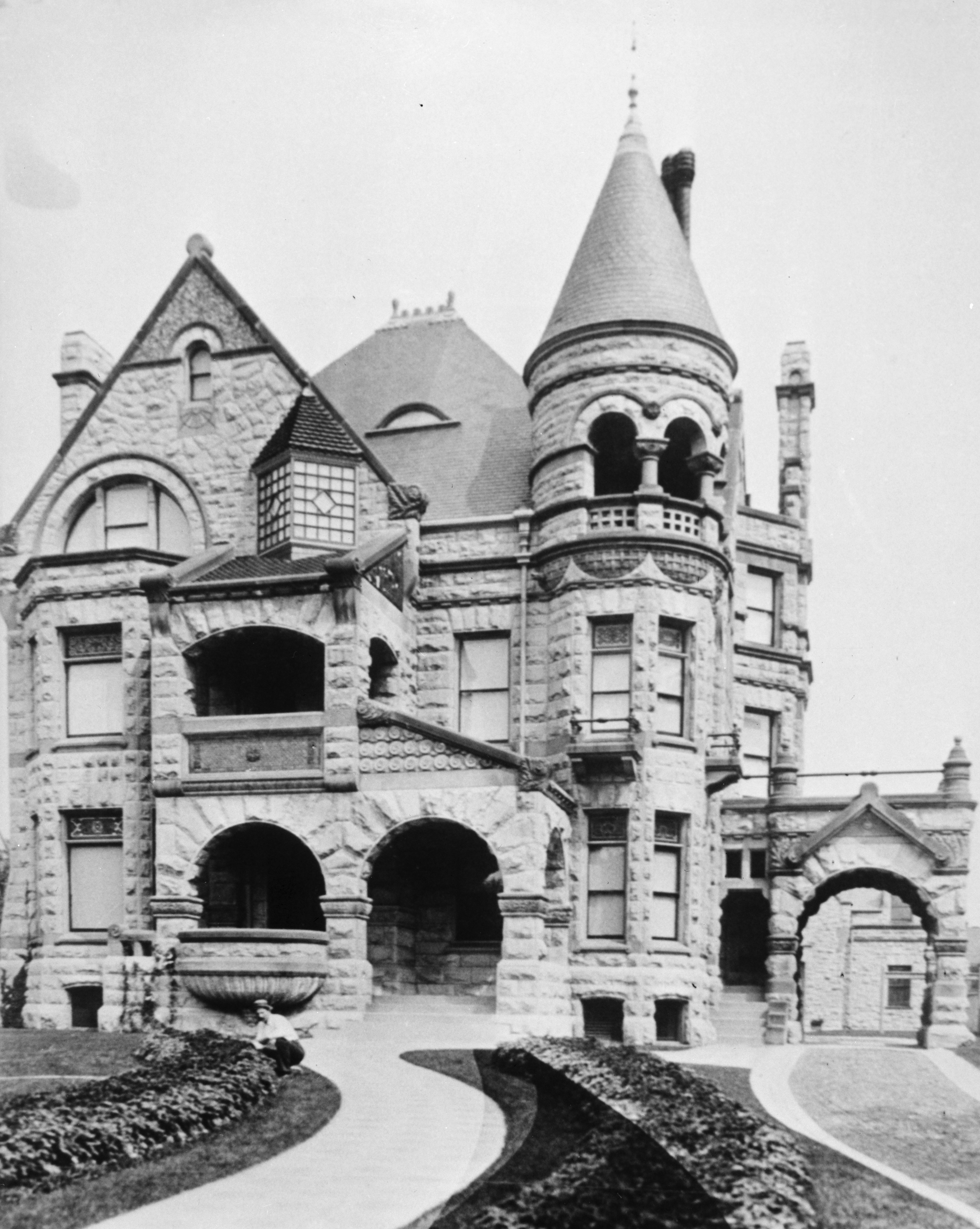
- Elizabeth Plankinton House

- Location within Wisconsin
- Alternative names: Knights of Columbus Building
- Etymology: Elizabeth Plankinton

General information
- Architectural style: Richardsonian Romanesque
- Location: 1492 W. Wisconsin Avenue, Milwaukee, Wisconsin, United States
- Coordinates: 43°2′20″N 87°55′53″W
- Construction started: 1886
- Construction stopped: 1888
- Demolished: October 11, 1980
- Cost: $100,000

Technical details
- Material: Stone
- Floor count: 3

Design and construction
- Architect: Edward Townsend Mix

The Elizabeth Plankinton House was a stone structure in Milwaukee, Wisconsin, U.S., intended to be the residence for Elizabeth Plankinton. Built between 1886 and 1888 by John Plankinton for his daughter as a wedding gift, it cost at least $100,000 (equivalent to $3.1 million in 2024). The architect Edward Townsend Mix designed the house in the Richardsonian Romanesque style. It was located opposite John Plankinton's own house on Grand Avenue in an upscale residential area of the western part of the city, near other mansions. Mrs. Margaret Johnston was the only person to have a permanent residence in the house (1896–1904). The Knights of Columbus used the property between 1910 and 1978. Despite being listed in the National Register of Historic Places in 1976, the house was demolished on October 11, 1980, to make way for student facilities for Marquette University. The facility ultimately built was the Marquette Alumni Memorial Union. It is extremely close to the site of the house, but the majority of the land occupied by the house remains a grass lawn.

== Construction ==
The three-bedroom house was located at 1432 Grand Avenue, later known as 1492 West Wisconsin Avenue (north side between 14th Street and 15th Street), in Milwaukee. The Knights of Columbus had the house number changed from "1432" to the more historic (and Columbus-related) "1492" date, and it was also referred to as the "Knights of Columbus Building". Local historians H. Russell Zimmermann and Mary Ellen Young attribute the house as being designed by Edward Townsend Mix. It was a three-story stone structure with an attic and basement. According to the Historic American Buildings Survey (HABS) done in 1980 by the United States Department of the Interior, the house was constructed between 1886, when ownership was transferred to Elizabeth, and 1888, when it appears in Rascher's Fire Insurance Atlas of City of Milwaukee. Zimmerman notes that an inscription dated 1887 was discovered on a piece of roofing slate in 1979, and suggests that the house was likely finished in that year; Reports of the costs of construction vary from $100,000 to $150,000 (equivalent to $3.1 to $4.6 million in 2024).

The basic building was square and had three projecting bays. The front of the house had a three-story conical turret, a stone porch, a porte-cochere, and a sunroom on the west side. The width was around 50 feet overall, depending on the section of the house measured. The depth of the house was about 70 feet, depending on which part. The exterior walls were of Cream City brick from Wauwatosa, Wisconsin. It was trimmed with carved buff ashlar sandstone, granite columns, terracotta tiles, and metal work.

The main entrance facing south had a one-and-a-half-story entrance porch with arches. The house roof had red clay tiles. On the east side of the house was a porte-cochere, a protruding exterior part with a round arched opening and a flat roof for a weather-protected side entrance. This entrance had granite columns with leafed plants growing all around them.

According to Zimmermann, the Plankinton mansion was exceptional in that "almost the entire project is designed and drawn by an architect [which] shows in the way all of the components of a given room are compatibly related to the whole." The amount of money spent was reflected in the craftsmanship, which he illustrates with a first-floor fireplace:

The carving is crisp and sharp with frequent undercutting, and the handling of foliage is life-like. (The same details and ornamentation are carried throughout the room in window and door casings, pilasters and cornices.) The cast iron firebox liner is embellished with reeded-strap scrolls and Romanesque leafwork. This is framed by an ornamental cast brass casing with lions-paw pilasters. Surrounding the opening, and on the hearth, are five different majolica tile patterns in four colors. Made by J. & J. G. Low Co., these include two three-tile groups of winged cherubs ascending through clouds. The mantel slab is supported by four bulbous columns made like inverted pinecones with modified composite capitals. Above is a large beveled plate mirror flanked by carved olive branch columns. A mirrored arcade tops the fireplace complex, and this is all recessed behind a large, arched, spindle grille which also encloses eight small windows and two large ones and a pair of leather upholstered benches.

The HABS report notes that a skylight was removed in 1976 and sold, but that it was 16 by 6 feet (4.9 by 1.8 m) in size and had a mosaic design of 25,000 parts of zinc-framed stained glass pieces lined with copper. In line with John Plankinton's philosophy and to prove the capabilities of local workers, he ensured that "every part of it was made and prepared in Milwaukee by Milwaukee men," as was reported in John's 1891 obituary in the Milwaukee Sentinel.

== History ==
The Elizabeth Plankinton House was a mansion in Milwaukee built in 1886 as a wedding gift to Elizabeth from her father, businessman John Plankinton, known as "A Merchant Prince and Princely Merchant" for his philanthropy. The house was designed in the Richardsonian Romanesque architectural style. It was one of many such mansions owned by the wealthy in the west part of Milwaukee in the late 19th century. It was in the residential area on Grand Avenue (later Wisconsin Avenue) in the downtown district of the city.

Elizabeth was abandoned by her fiancé, sculptor Richard Hamilton Park, when he married a dancer from Minneapolis on September 18, 1887. She was so distraught that she turned down the wedding gift and never lived in the house. She never married, and died in 1923. The stone structure was not occupied for almost 10 years. In 1896, Mrs. Margaret Johnston, a widow, bought the house to live in, and it passed on to her family upon her death in 1904. They sold it in 1910 to the local Knights of Columbus, who used it as their local city facility. In 1915 they erected a two-story rear addition that was 93 feet wide by 144 feet deep and was used as an auditorium and gymnasium. They used the main house as their headquarters from about 1919 to 1978. However, ownership was acquired in 1967 by the Milwaukee Redevelopment Authority, and they passed it to Marquette University in 1975. The house was listed in the National Register of Historic Places in 1976.

== Gallery of pictures ==
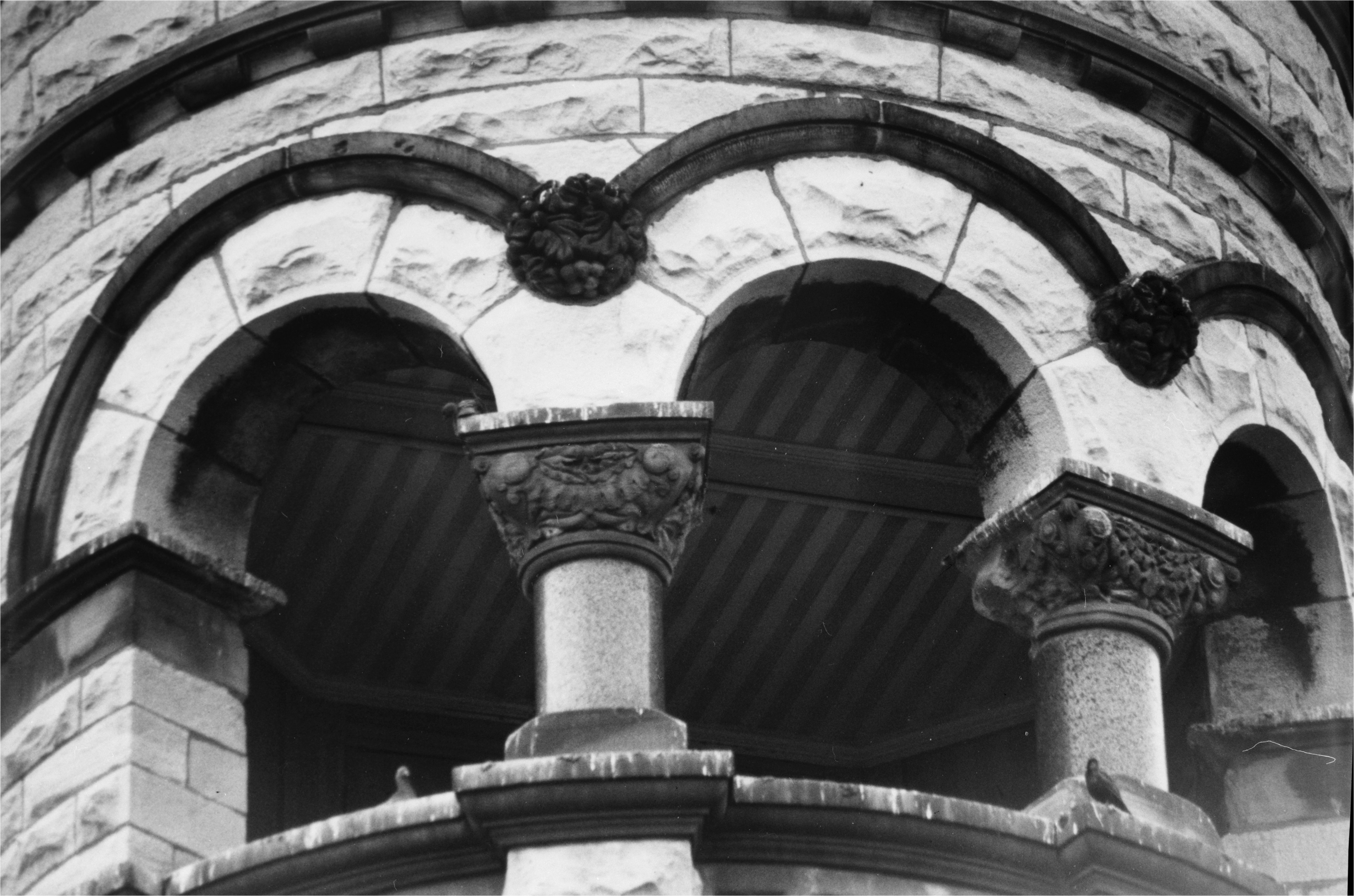
Third floor balcony of turret exterior

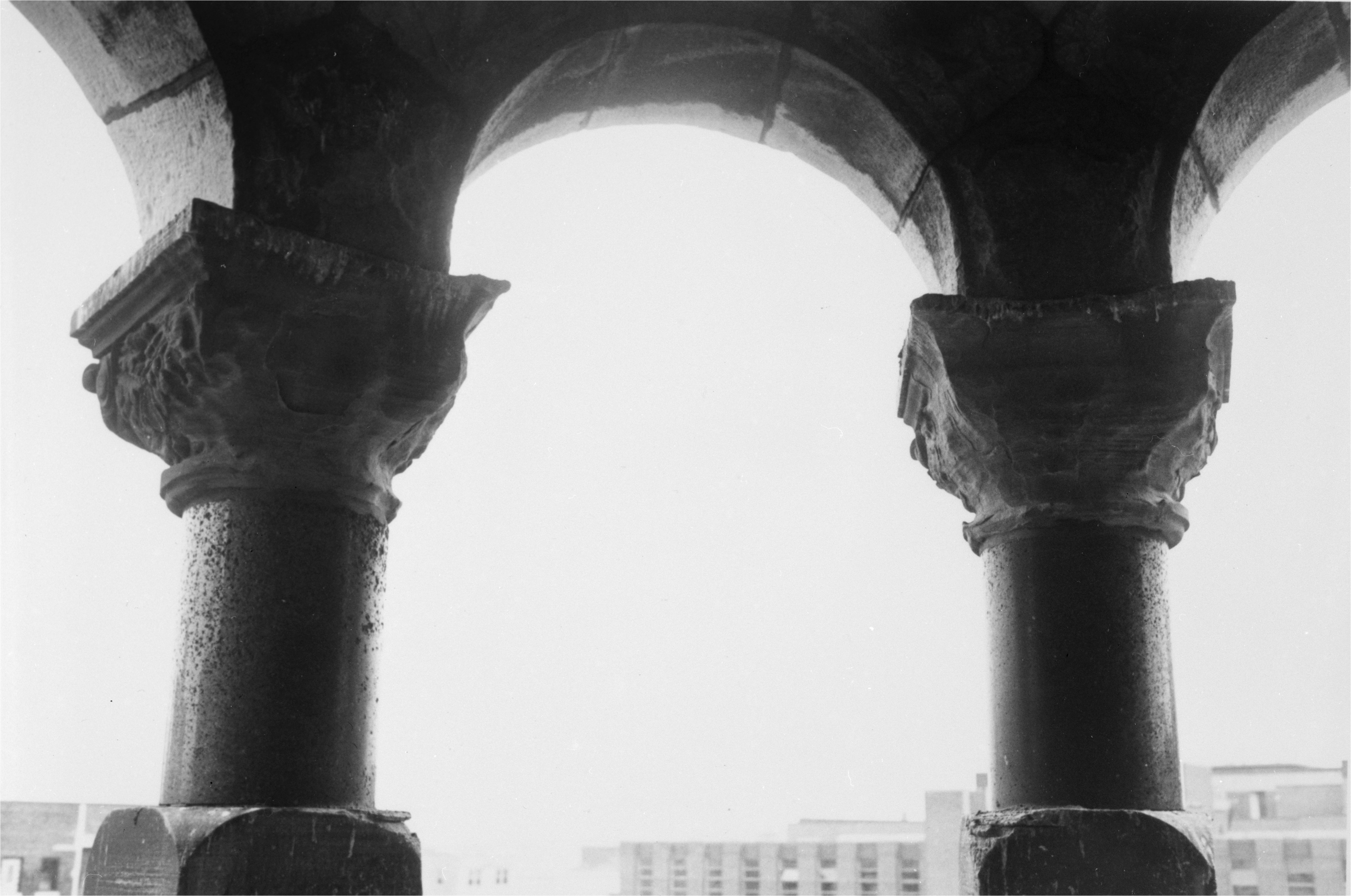
Third floor balcony column capital

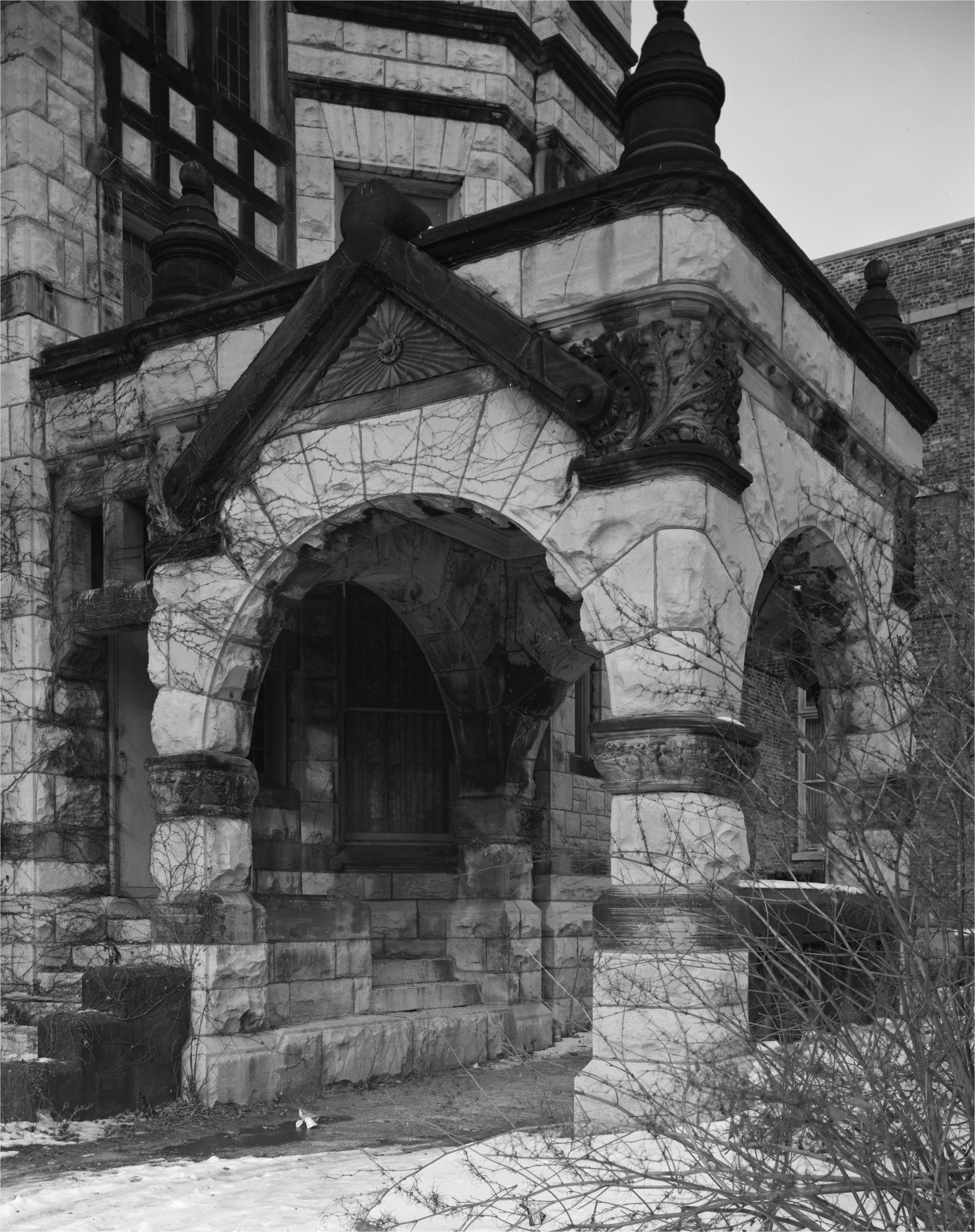
East side of house porte-cochere

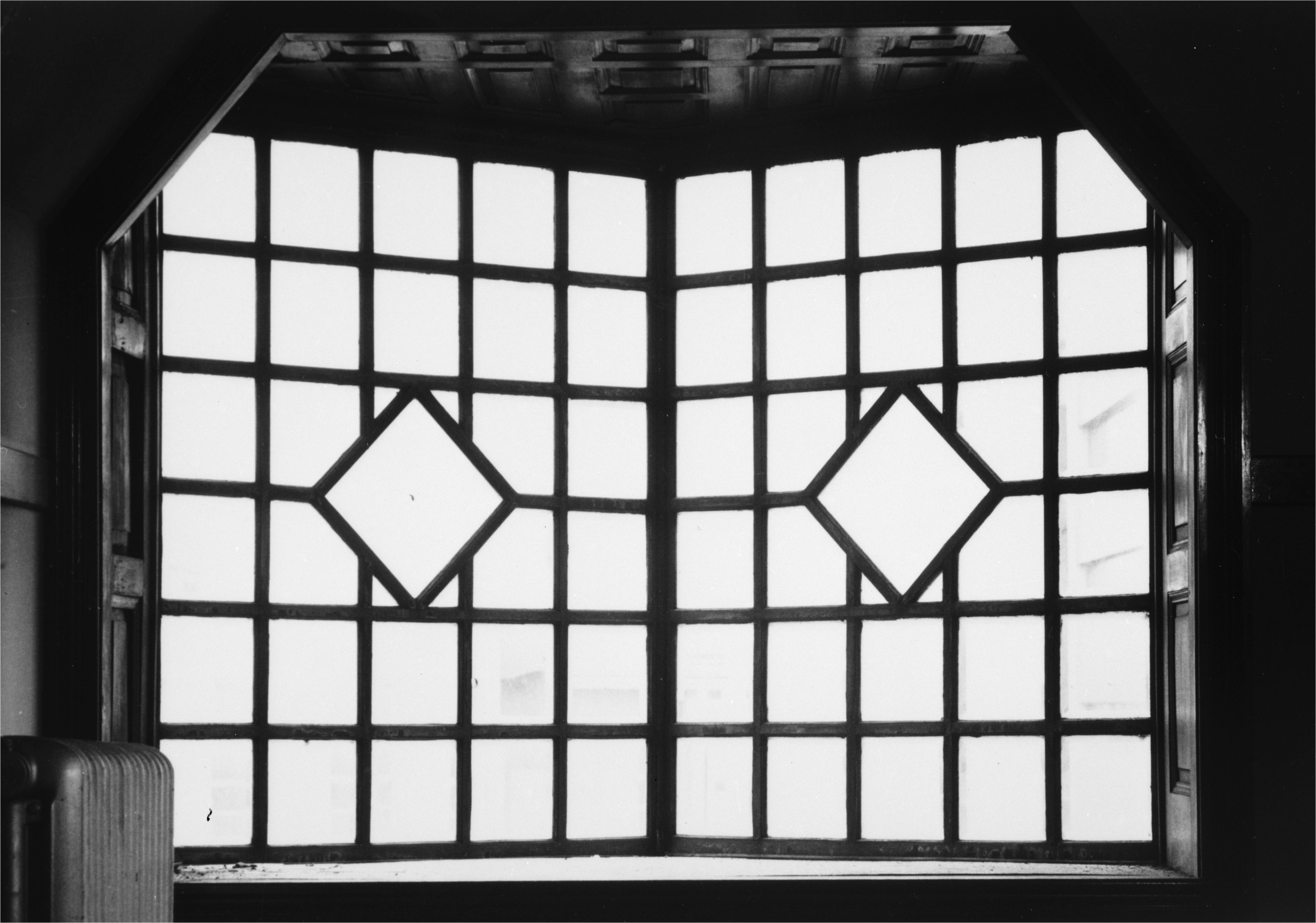
Third floor window of house
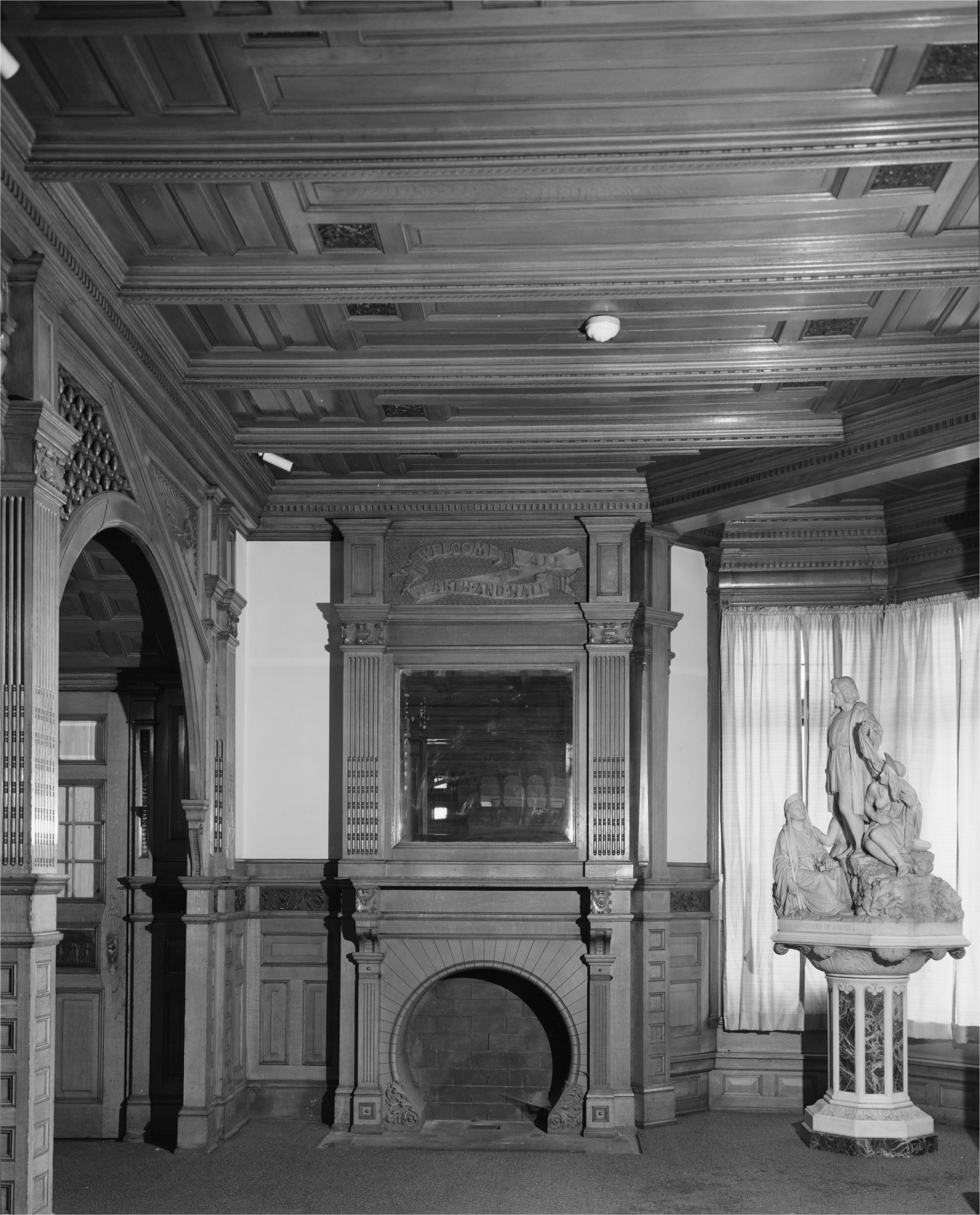
East view of 1st floor main hall

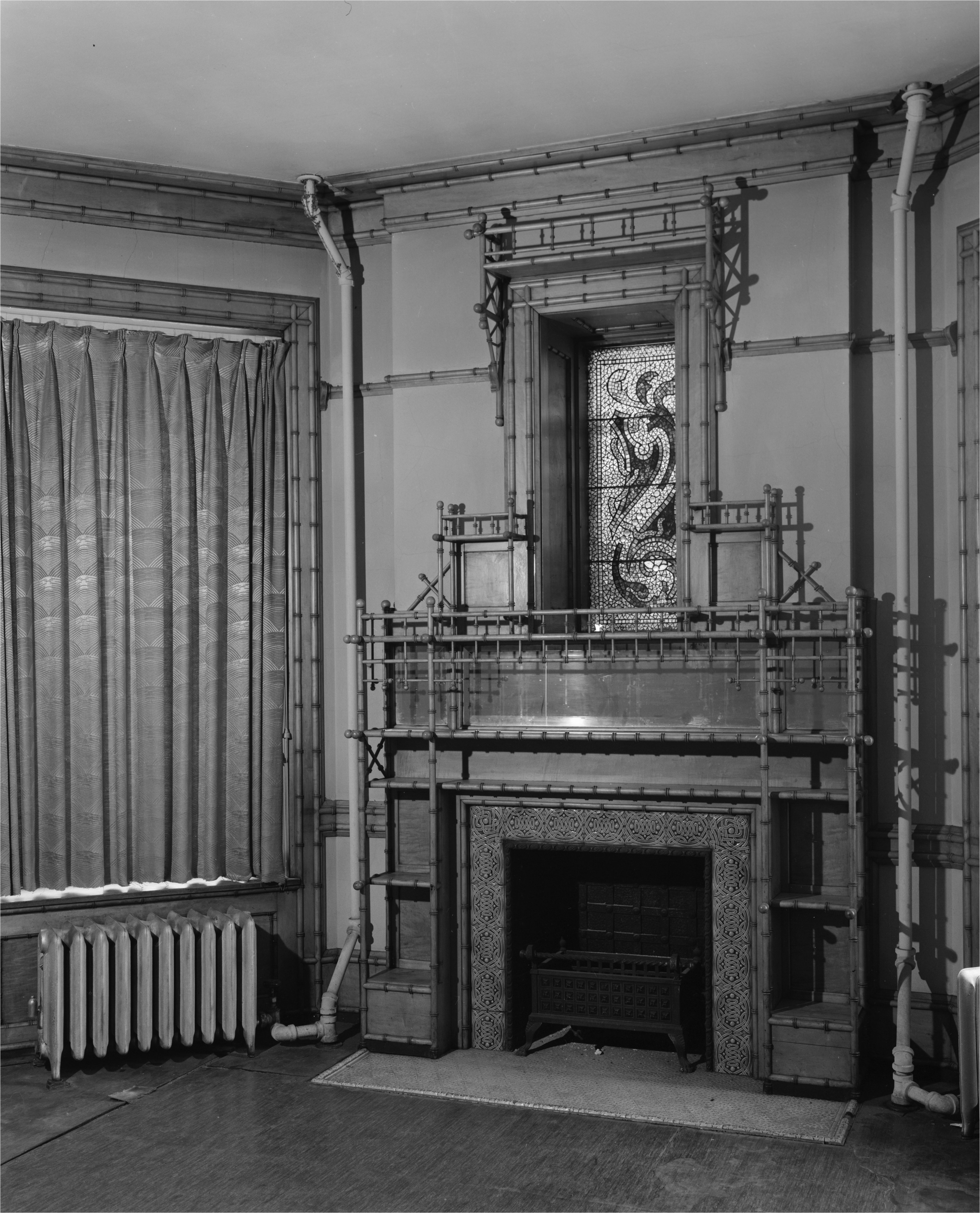
East view of northeast bedroom

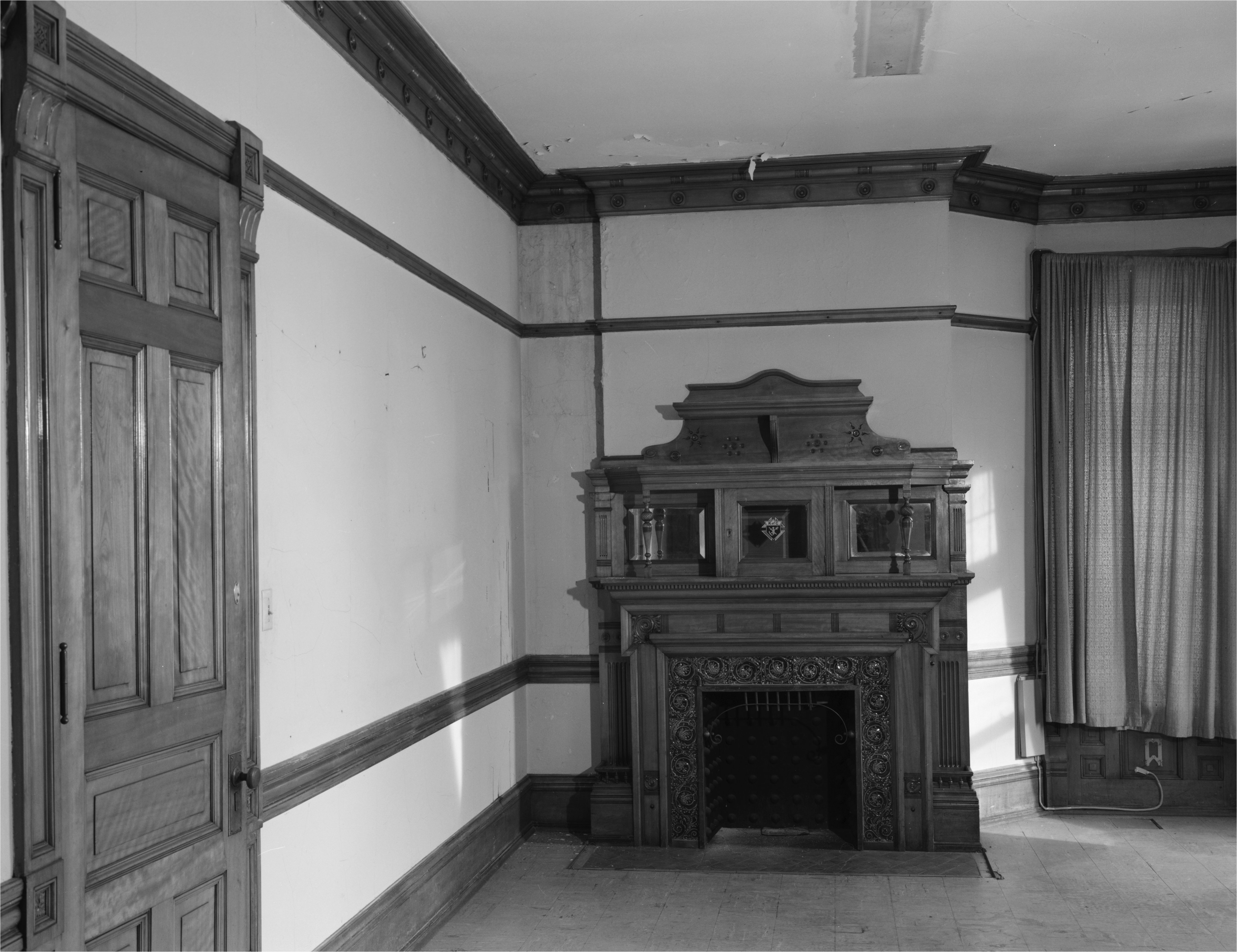
East view of southeast bedroom

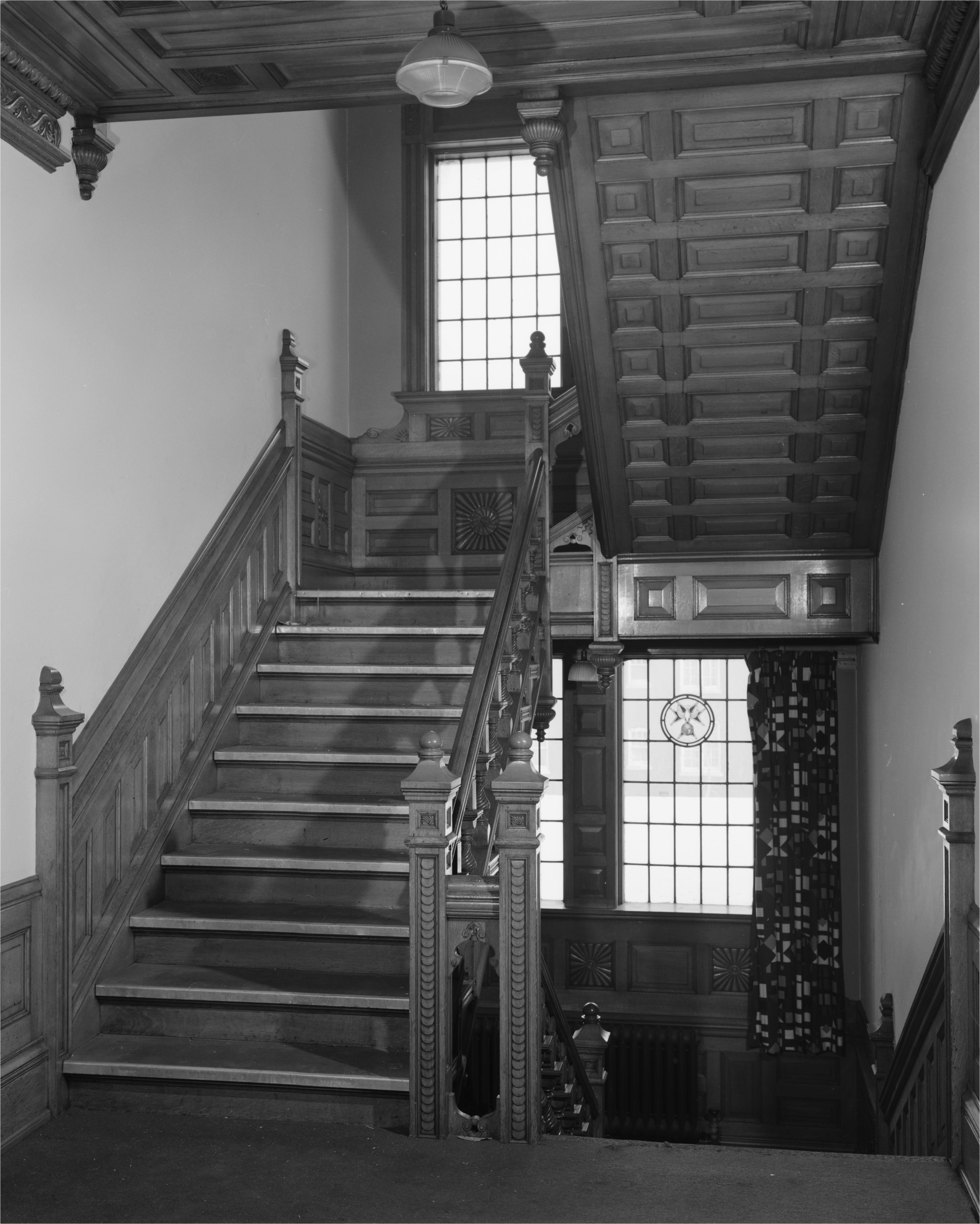
East view of staircase to 3rd floor

== Demolition ==
A 1978 newspaper article discussing the house was titled "Ugly Behemoth Blocks Progress", and there were many negative characterizations of the house. Representatives of Marquette University argued that the "Knights of Columbus mansion is neither historical nor architecturally significant. It is the product of the whims of the owner and the architect, and does not represent a true example of any particular style of architecture" and that "to offer an eyesore like the Knights of Columbus building as an example of our great architectural tradition will make Milwaukee the laughing stock of the nation. . . . This mansion has no significant historical value . . . [and is] a monument to Victorian bad taste." Zimmermann offered a strong defense of the building in a 1979 article in Milwaukee, the Metropolitan Magazine, arguing it was "Milwaukee's finest residential example of the Richardsonian Romanesque style", designed by "the area's most prominent 19th century architect," and was still in "relatively fine original condition". On the point of its condition at that time, the HABS report described it as having a pristine exterior and an intact interior. Zimmermann concluded:

There can be no question about the quality of Milwaukee craftsmanship in this imposing mansion. Nor, for many often-repeated reasons, can we find fault with the Plankinton's history or the architect's reputation. And those who personally dislike the exterior design should be reminded that, by every standard required in the National Register Criteria for Evaluation, this specimen is a deserving recipient of that high honor. The number of good Victorian buildings in Milwaukee has been so reduced that we can no longer afford to look the other way when one of National Register status is on trial. The Elizabeth Plankinton mansion should remain as a permanent marker in Milwaukee's historical continuum.

By 1980, the House was entirely surrounded by other buildings of the university. Marquette had it demolished on October 11, 1980, approximately two months after the HABS survey report was issued, and despite its 1976 inclusion on the National Register of Historic Places. Its destruction led to the formation of the City of Milwaukee Historic Preservation Commission in 1981, an appointed city commission created with the aim of protecting Milwaukee's architectural heritage.

== See also ==
- William Plankinton Mansion
