= Marquette University College of Nursing =

Private nursing school in Milwaukee, Wisconsin, US

Coordinates: 43.036823°N 87.93214°W

- Type: Private
- Established: 1912
- Affiliations: Catholic, Jesuit
- Dean: Jill Guttormson
- Location: Milwaukee, Wisconsin, United States
- Campus: Urban
- Website: marquette.edu/nursing

The Marquette University College of Nursing is one of the constituent colleges at Marquette University, located in Milwaukee, Wisconsin. Its programs and curricula are accredited by the Commission on Collegiate Nursing Education, the Accreditation Commission for Midwifery Education of the American College of Nurse-Midwives, the NCACSS and the Wisconsin State Board of Nursing.

== History ==
Nursing at Marquette began in 1912, when the university acquired the Trinity Hospital Training School for Nursing in Milwaukee and the nurses' residence. Although classes began soon after the acquisition, the College of Nursing officially became its own separate college in 1936. Over 7,000 students have graduated from Marquette's nursing program since its beginning. The college is housed in David Straz Nursing Building on Marquette's campus.

== Programs and reputation ==
The College of Nursing offers bachelor's, master's, and clinical doctorate degrees, as well as PhDs in nursing. There are also various dual-degree and interdisciplinary programs at both the undergraduate and graduate levels.

In 2023, U.S. News & World Report listed the college's undergraduate program as the 52nd-best in the country. Its graduate program was ranked 58th nationally in 2024; the DNP program placed 85th and the anesthesia program placed 51st in the same rankings.
