= William Plankinton =

American businessman and industrialist

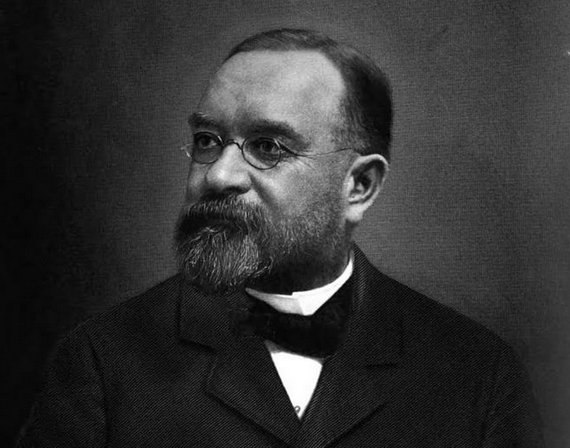
- Plankinton c. 1905
- Born: November 7, 1843; Allegheny, Pennsylvania, U.S.
- Died: April 29, 1905 (aged 61)
- Occupations: Businessman and industrialist
- Spouse: Mary Ella Woods
- Children: 2
- Parent(s): John Plankinton; Elizabeth Bracken Plankinton
- Relatives: Elizabeth Plankinton (sister)

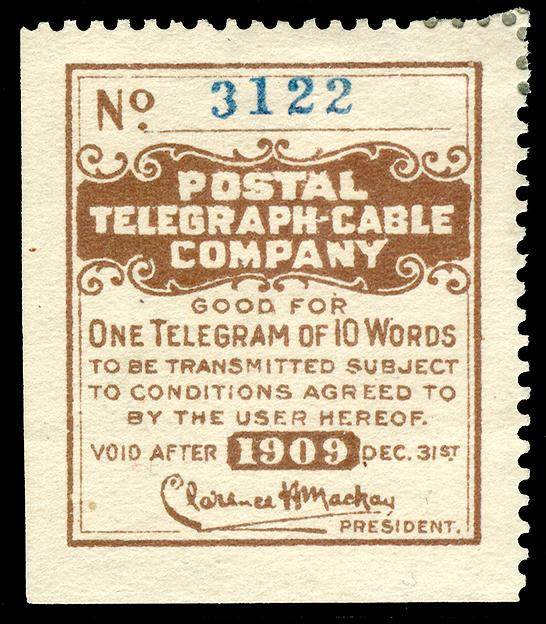
Postal Telegraph stamp 1909

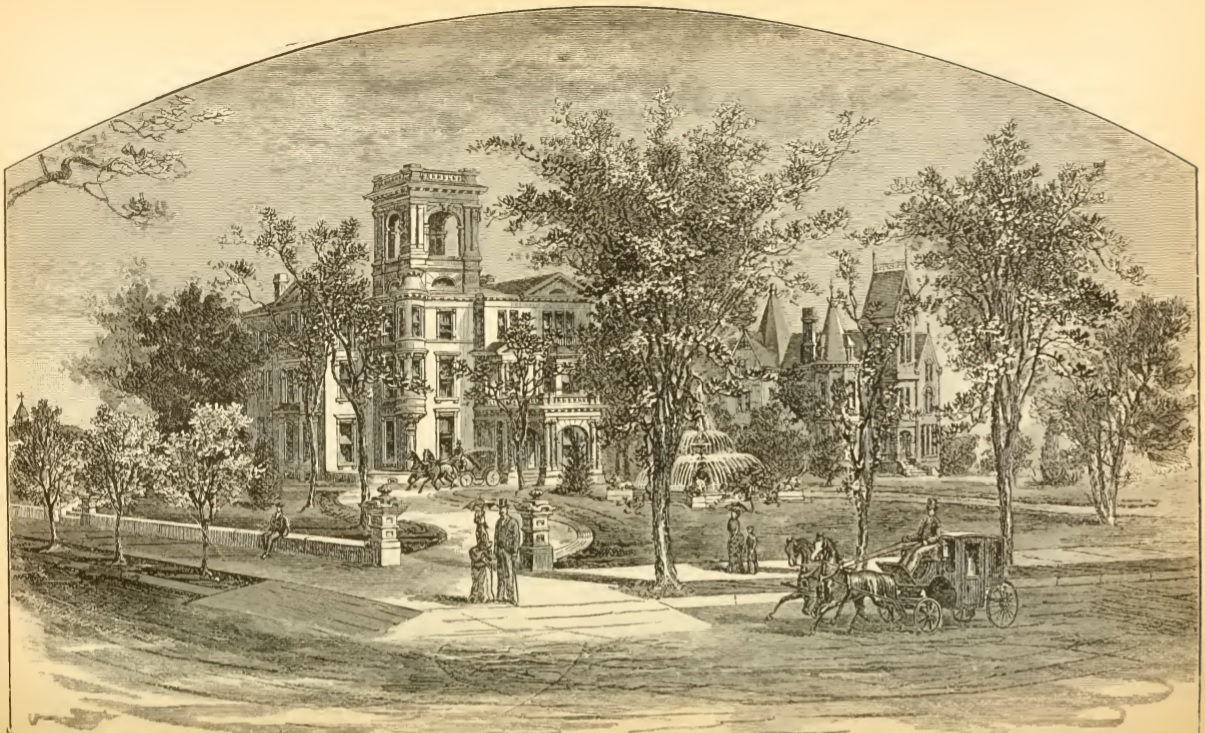
Line drawings of the mansions of John Plankinton (left) and William's (right), by James Smith Buck about 1886

William Plankinton (November 7, 1843 – April 29, 1905) was an American businessman, manufacturer, and industrialist. He followed in his father's footsteps in the meat packing and meat processing industry.

Plankinton was associated with the Milwaukee museum, public library, industrial exposition and Chamber of Commerce. As a businessman he was a banker. He was implicated in a scandal of fraud and embezzlement, for which he was sued.

== Early life ==
Plankinton was born in Allegheny, Pennsylvania, on November 7, 1843. He was the son of John Plankinton and Elizabeth Bracken Plankinton. While he was still a baby his parents moved to Milwaukee, Wisconsin Territory. He received his early education in the Milwaukee public schools. After graduating from high school, he attended a college in Milwaukee.

== Career ==
Plankinton was employed by his father after he graduated from the Milwaukee college. He soon became a partner in his father's pork and beef packing company. He helped to establish branches in Chicago, Kansas City and New York. The firm became known in 1893 as the Plankinton Packing Company when the Cudahy brothers moved their operations south to a site just outside of Milwaukee. Plankinton's main competitors were the meat packing companies of Chicago.

Plankinton helped found and organize several companies, including the Milwaukee-based Johnson Electric Company. He founded and was part owner of the Western Portland Cement company in Yankton, South Dakota. Plankinton held several public offices and was a director of the Milwaukee museum, the city public library, and the Milwaukee industrial exposition. He was also associated with Layton art gallery and the local Chamber of Commerce. Plankinton was one of the financial backers of the Postal Telegraph Company that involved telegraph lines in Wisconsin and Michigan.

Plankinton became vice-president of the Plankinton Bank in 1891 upon his father's death. He was involved with settling the affairs when the bank failed in 1893. The bank crisis involved a scandal of fraud and embezzlement in which Plankinton was implicated. He was sued to pay back all that was owed to the depositors and creditors.

Loans made by the bank to Frank A. Lappen and his companies totaling almost $300,000 precipitated the crisis. Lappen was summoned to court to testify about his failure to pay back creditors $750,000, but disappeared to Mexico and could not be extradited. Philip Danforth Armour, the Chicago meat packer businessman of Armour and Company, was reported to have given $600,000 in gold to help the Plankinton bank pay back those it owed money to.

== Personal ==
On 26 April 1876, he married Mary Ella Woods, of Cincinnati, Ohio, and they had two children. He lived next door to his father in a mansion on Grand Avenue in Milwaukee given to him by his father as a wedding gift.

== Later life and death ==
Plankinton died in Milwaukee on April 29, 1905. The cause of his death was pneumonia, which he had suffered from for three months prior. Plankinton left an estate valued at approximately $4 million to his heirs. His widowed wife received a third and his children split the remainder in equal shares that included the widow. She died September 7, 1908.

== Sources ==
- Apps, Jerry (17 August 2015). Wisconsin Agriculture: A History. Wisconsin Historical Society Press. ISBN 978-0-87020-725-9.
- Bowman, Francis Favill (1948). Why Wisconsin. F.F. Bowman.
- Buck, James Smith (1886). Milwaukee Under the Charter: Volume 4 – From 1854 to 1860 Inclusive. Milwaukee News Co.
- Buck, James Smith (1890). Pioneer History of Milwaukee.
- Chilton (1905). The Iron Age. Chilton Company.
- Historical Society (1906). Society at Its 34th Annual Meeting Proceedings. State Historical Society of Wisconsin.
- Watrous, Jerome A. (1909). Memoirs of Milwaukee County. Western Historical Association. p. 20.
- West (1918). The Northwestern Reporter. West Publishing Company.
- Wilson, James Grant; Fiske, John; Dick, Charles (1915). Encyclopedia of American Biography. Press Association Compilers.
