= Susan Stuart Frackelton =

American painter

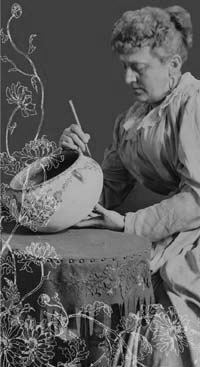
- Born: Susan Stuart Goodrich; June 5, 1848; Milwaukee, Wisconsin
- Died: April 14, 1932 (aged 83); Kenilworth, Illinois
- Resting place: Forest Home Cemetery, Milwaukee, Wisconsin; 42°59′53″N 87°56′35″W
- Education: Henry Vianden
- Known for: painting, ceramic painting

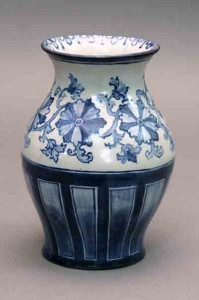
Susan Stuart Frackelton, oval shaped vase, circa 1894–1906, Milwaukee County Historical Society

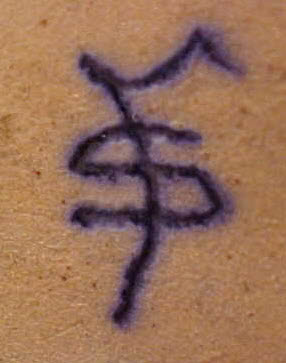
Susan Frackelton Makers Mark - 1900

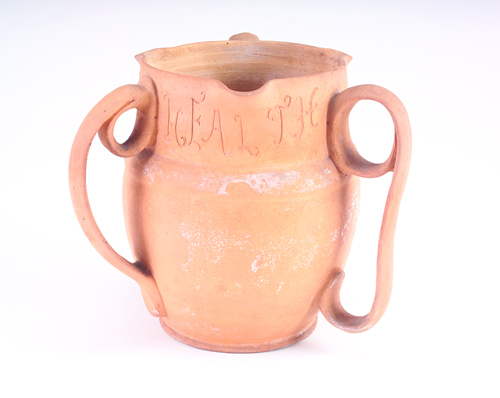
Susan Stuart Frackelton and George E. Ohr, Health, Wealth and Happiness, 1899

Susan Stuart Goodrich Frackelton (1848–1932) was an American painter, specializing in painting ceramics. She was a leader in the Arts and Crafts movement in the United States and author of Tried by Fire, the "most popular handbook for decorators of chinaware", having reached a national audience.

== Personal life ==
Susan Stuart Goodrich was born on June 5, 1848, in Milwaukee, Wisconsin to her parents of New England birth, Edwin H. Goodrich and Mary S. Robinson Goodrich. She attended private schools in Milwaukee and New York City.

She married Richard Frackelton on July 19, 1869. He was born in London, England and immigrated to the United States about 1857. They lived in Milwaukee, where they raised a daughter and three sons. Her husband ran an import business that failed. The success of Susan Frackelton's businesses, though, helped secure the financial future of their family. Frackelton sued for divorce from her husband due to his inability to support the family and cruel and inhuman treatment, including engaging in "one series of cursing and swearing at the new woman." By 1899 there were two adult sons, one had died by then, and an eleven-year-old daughter. Richard Frackelton died in 1907. In 1920 Frackelton lived in Chicago, Illinois and went to Haiti for a three-month holiday. She was a member of the Daughters of the American Revolution and the Chicago Woman's Club.

She died on April 14, 1932, at her home in Kenilworth, Illinois, and was buried two days later in the Forest Home Cemetery in Milwaukee.

== Career ==
Frackelton studied landscape painting in Milwaukee under Henry Vianden. She made baskets, lace, and jewelry. She worked with leather, carved wood, wove and painted cloth and worked with metal before focusing on ceramics in 1876. She also lectured to a wide range of audiences.

In 1883 she founded the Frackelton China and Decorating Works, where she successfully ran a china painting enterprise and provided painting instruction in downtown Milwaukee. She patented Frackelton's Dry Colors in 1894. Frackelton designed and patented a home kiln machine. She created a particular style of art pottery called the Frackelton "Blue and Grey" which is blue painted ware with a grey glaze. Her "Makers Mark" was a "SF" painted on the underside of each produced item.

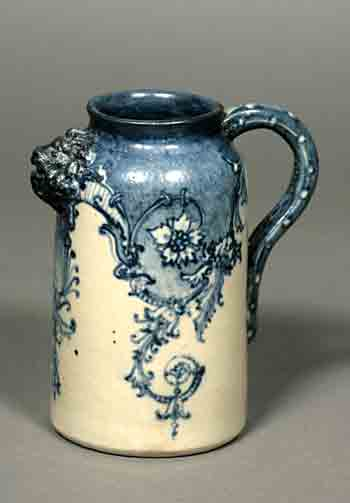
Susan Stuart Frackelton, pitcher, 1901, Milwaukee County Historical Society

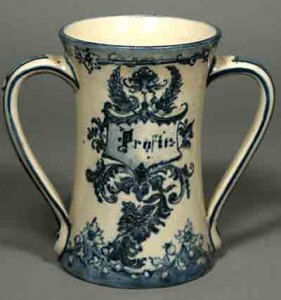
Susan Stuart Frackelton, loving cup, 1894–1906, Milwaukee County Historical Society

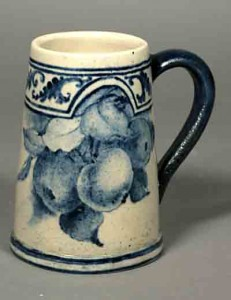
Susan Stuart Frackelton, stein, 1894–1906, Milwaukee County Historical Society

Frackelton was successful as a 19th-century woman artist, including having been the creator of the Blue and Grey pottery, painter of china and maker of book illuminations:

Her innovation in those art forms helped elevate American decorative arts to a standard of excellence and, at the same time, dispelled any myths about women being unable to rise above the rank of an amateur artist. Akin to women of today, she used her talents as an artist and entrepreneur to break through the bonds of traditional gender roles, both in the art world and society... The medals and awards that she won dispelled any notions that a woman could compete on a national and international stage in the ceramic arts.

In 1892 she founded the National League of Mineral Painters, which included members Adelaïde Alsop Robineau and Mary Chase Perry. Frackelton was president of a local association of professional artists, that merged into the Milwaukee Art Institute, and at last into the Milwaukee Art Museum. She was also president of the Wisconsin School of Design.

At the 1893 World's Fair she exhibited her salt-glazed ware and won nine awards for sets of her works. She won other medals at exhibitions in Europe and the United States in the 1880s and 1890s. Margherita of Savoy, the Italian queen congratulated her via letter to her good works and arranged for Frackelton to present her works to the court.

In 1899 she jointly made pottery with ceramic artist George E. Ohr. At the 1900 Paris Exposition Universelle she exhibited her delftwares. Her works are among the Wisconsin Historical Society, Milwaukee Public Museum, Milwaukee County Historical Society and Sinsinawa Mound.

In 2005 she posthumously was awarded the Wisconsin Visual Art Lifetime Achievement Award "due to her ground-breaking work with ceramics, china painting and the art pottery movement of the late 19th century."
