= Alfons Zeileis =

German painter

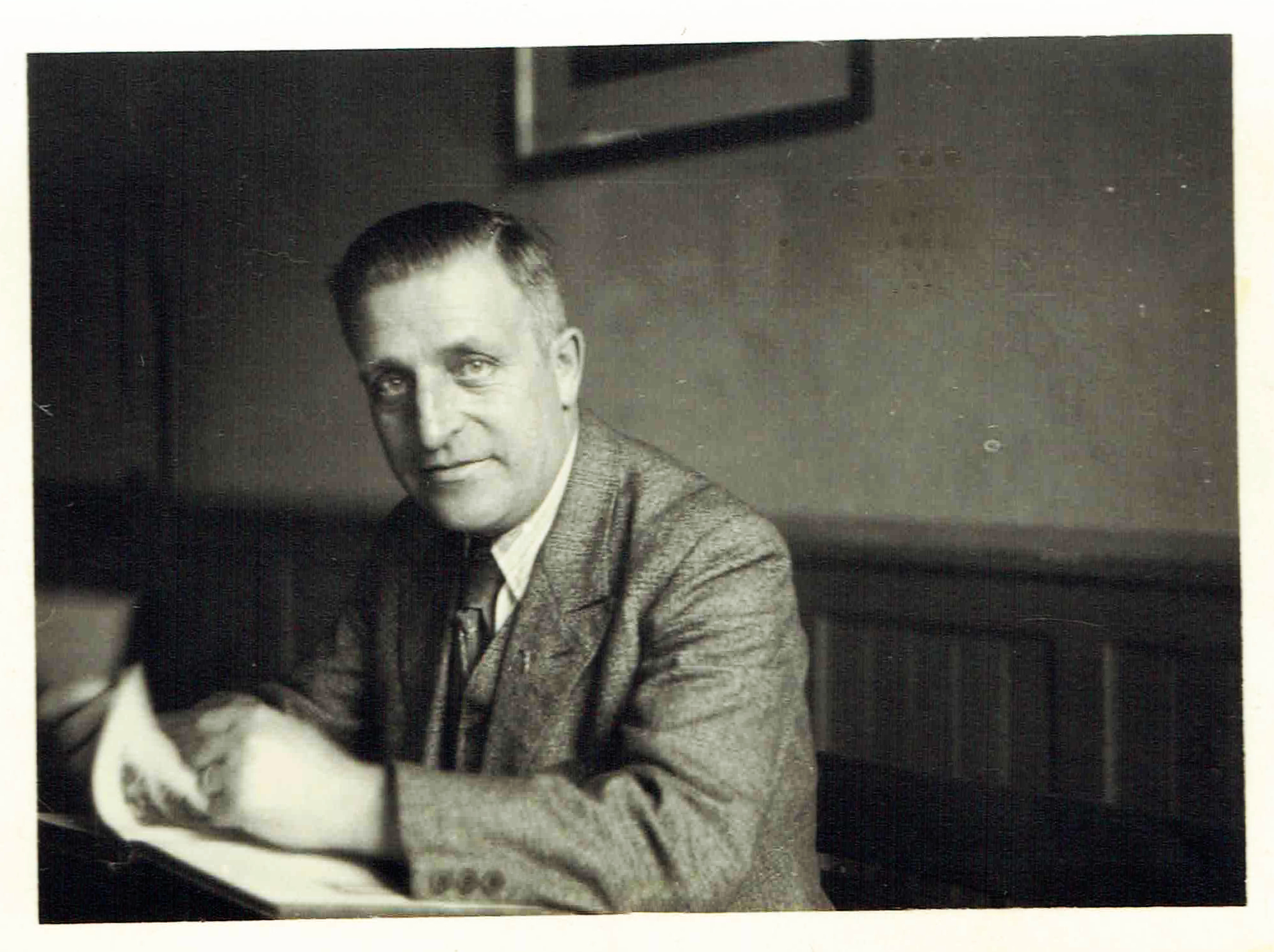
Alfons Zeileis, 1936

Alfons Zeileis (31 July 1887 – 25 March 1963) was a German painter and art teacher. He was best known for his paintings from the Munich area and the southern Palatinate. He mainly painted in the Impressionist and Expressionist styles. As a student at the Academy of Fine Arts Munich (Akademie der Bildenden Künste), he received numerous awards and participated in joint exhibitions as a member of the Arbeitsgemeinschaft Pfälzer Künstler, an organisation of Palatinate Artists. As a secondary school teacher at the Realanstalt am Donnersberg today and teacher at the Humanist Gymnasium zu Neustadt, today Kurfürst-Ruprecht-Gymnasium Neustadt, he worked as a teacher for many years.

After his death, his daughter supported exhibitions of his paintings.

== Life ==
In the Vollmer Künstlerlexikon, his birthplace is named as "Hasenlohr". This is a reading error in Fraktur script. Alfons Zeileis was born in Hafenlohr as the son of Mr August Zeileis, Royal Post and Railway Expeditor, and Maria Zeileis, née Lutz.

From 1897 to 1904, he attended the humanistic grammar school in Würzburg and from 1904 to 1906, the School of Arts and Crafts in Nuremberg, today the Academy of Fine Arts Nuremberg. From 1906 to 1908 he studied at the Academy of Fine Arts in Munich (Akademie der Bildenden Künste) and graduated in 1908. His fellow students in the painting class of Gabriel von Hackl were among others the Italian Painter Giorgio de Chirico, the Greek Painter Markos Zavitsianos and the austrian painter Karl von Blaas. He continued his studies at the academy until 1914 and financed himself with small scholarships and commissions. He attended the drawing class with Gabriel von Hackl, the painting class with Carl von Marr and Ludwig von Herterich and the composing class with de:Carl Johann Becker-Gundahl

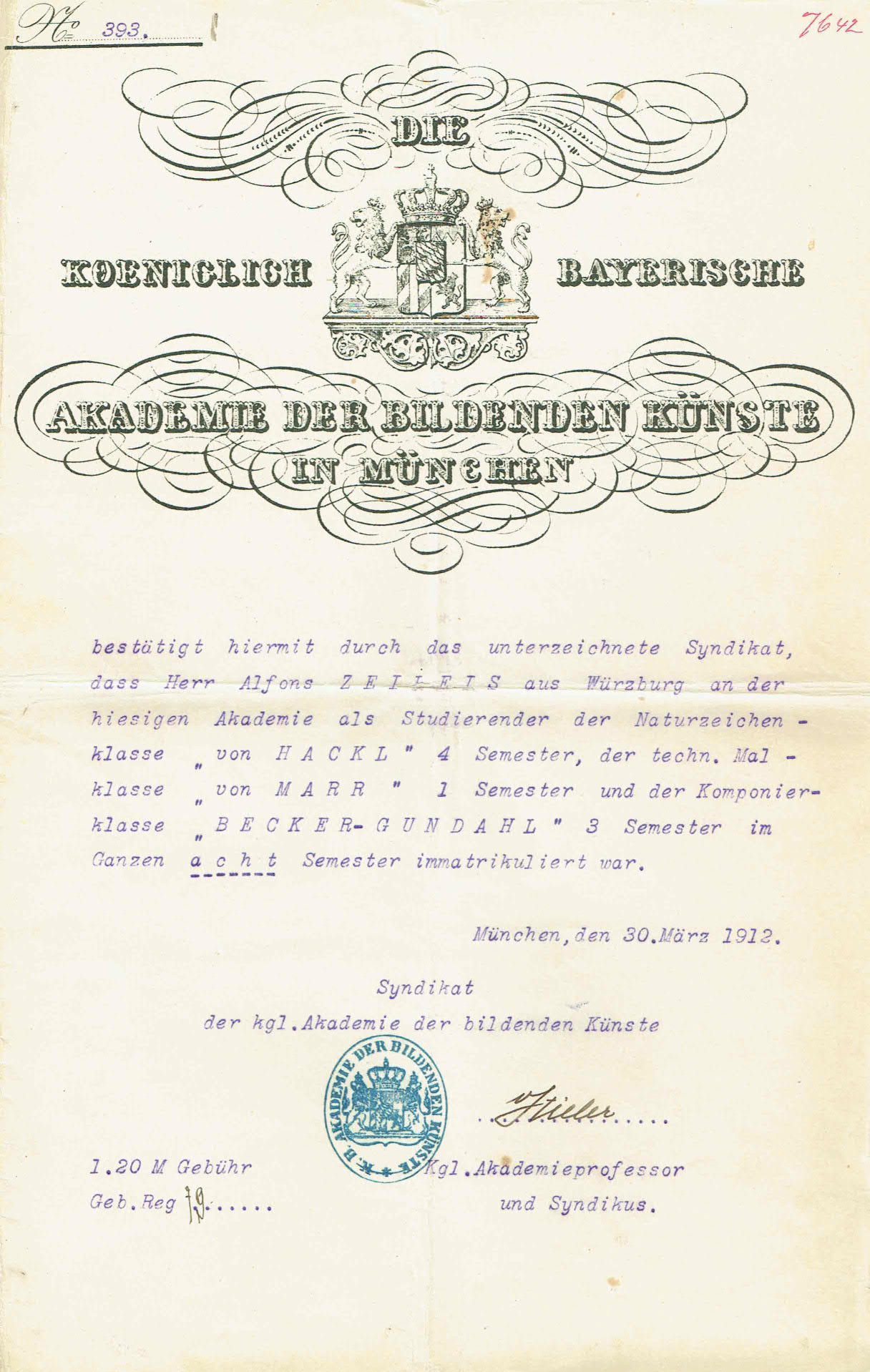
Confirmation of the Academy of Fine Arts in Munich

Alfons Zeileis was active in the Dachau Artists' Colony in 1907, 1908, 1911 and 1913.

In 1913, Alfons Zeileis took part in a collective exhibition at the Neuer Kunstsalon at Königinstraße 44 in Munich. In addition to Alfons Zeileis, de:Egon Adler (painter), who was close to Der Blaue Reiter, the Rhineland Expressionist Carlo Mense, the graphic artist Walter Rehn and the American painter Albert Bloch, who was also close to Der Blaue Reiter, took part in this exhibition. Zeileis volunteered for the First World War in 1914. After spending time in various military hospitals, his military service was already over in 1916. In the summer of 1916, Alfons Zeileis was appointed as a drawing teacher at the "Realanstalt am Donnersberg", today's Gymnasium Weierhof. During his time in Marnheim in the Palatinate, Alfons Zeileis met his partner and wife Elisabeth in 1918.

After the war, he worked as an assistant at the Progymnasium Homburg and then as a teacher at the Kurfürst-Ruprecht-Gymnasium Neustadt an der Weinstraße. As a member of the Palatinate Artists' Association (Arbeitsgemeinschaft Pfälzer Künstler), he took part in numerous exhibitions from 1926 to 1930, which are listed on the German Wikipedia page de:Alfons Zeileis. In 1932 he moved to Hambach an der Weinstraße and in 1939 became a professor of studies at the Humanistische Gymnasium in Neustadt an der Weinstraße. In 1941, at the "Great German Art Exhibition" in Munich, the paintings submitted were not exhibited but classified as "degenerate art", confiscated by the police and not returned. During the Second World War, his house was confiscated and he had to live in various emergency shelters before returning to Neustadt on the Hambacher Höhe in 1951 and moving back into his own house in Hambach in 1955. Despite his difficult living situation, he took part in exhibitions organised by the Palatinate Artists' Working Group again from 1948. A list can be found on the German Wikipedia de:Alfons Zeileis. Alfons Zeileis died on March 25, 1963, in Neustadt an der Weinstraße, just a few days after his wife. After his death, several exhibitions of his works were organised. A list can be found on the German Wikipedia de:Alfons Zeileis.

== Honours received at the Academy of Fine Arts Munich ==
- July 19, 1907: honourable mention for drawing studies
- January 10, 1911: second prize for surrogate picture
- July 16, 1914: honourable mention for painting studies
- January 17, 1914: honorable mention for his "Group from the Flood"

== Reception ==
During his lifetime, Zeileis exhibited his paintings together with other well-known Palatinate artists such as Hans Purrmann, Otto Dill, de:Hermann Croissant and de:August Croissant. Even at that time, he stood out alongside these painters. On October 18, 1927, for example, the Rheinpfälzer wrote about the art exhibition in Landau: "The talented Alfons Zeileis would get lost in the Kokoschkaian confusion with his painting Stubaital." Zeileis continued to attract attention long after his death. Ursula Biffar wrote about the exhibition of paintings by Alfons Zeileis in Hambach at the beginning of June 1989 'The works exhibited here are predominantly late works with an expressive sense of colour present in his younger years. Bright shades of green, subdued with blue but with a different luminous effect, bright reds and yellows in a lavish distribution of colourfulness, tell of the vision and sense of colour of his later years. Zeileis was a master of perspective and of conveying wide and deep space. His landscapes are lost in the wide horizon. For him, nature also came to life through clouds; his skies are always moving, whether bright or in a melancholy, gloomy mood, such as the tree painting from his early years. Colour is always an equally important medium of expression alongside form. It carries the effect in the still life with apples as well as in the portrait or the forest detail. It does so all the more in the crucifixion scene from 1938, which is characterised by a strong reference to Expressionist visual styles.'

Ursula Biffar wrote about the exhibition in Bad Dürkheim in June 1991 'The first years of his artistic orientation seem to have been characterised by the expressionist orientations of the artists' colony "Dachauer Moos". At that time, he gained decisive experiences that shaped his future artistic work. He consolidated his inclination towards strong, expressive colouring, which never left him, even if – as his floral still lifes or the watercolour "Zigeunerfels" from 1950 show – he reduced the colours in impressionistic style and paid more attention to the reflecting light. Zeileis was connected to nature in an almost mystical way, to the landscape in its vastness or density, to the lush blooms on the doorstep. [...] His pictures are prime examples of orderly composition, of masterly composition. This architecture is characteristic of his best paintings. In every work, the powerfully contoured line is decisive, corresponding with the colour in equal tonal strength. His expressionist gesture intensified in his final years, when he turned to a strong colour palette. Bold colour combinations created a lively surface with a strong long-distance effect.'

Under the heading 'A master of seeing, the painter Alfons Zeileis", Karl Ritter wrote in 1991 'When looking at all of the painter's pictures, we feel very fortunate that Zeileis painted beyond all "isms". He painted what he saw, but he did not depict: "He made visible what his senses recognised in nature through the veil of his soul" (E.A.Poe)'

== Alfons Zeileis' Paintings ==
Alfons Zeileis left behind an extensive body of work in his estate. Here some examples:

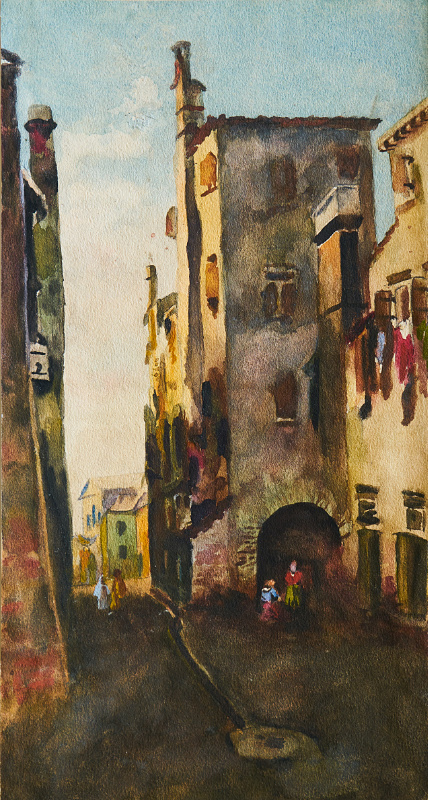
1903 Inner city idyll, Watercolour, 31x16 cm

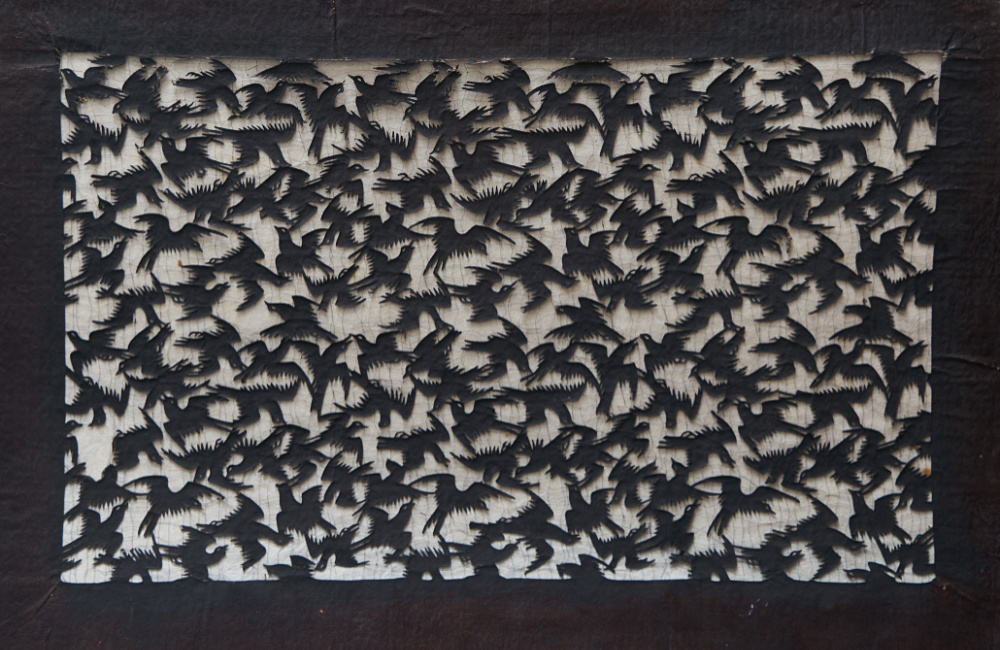
1906 Silhouette 1 ca. 40x27 cm

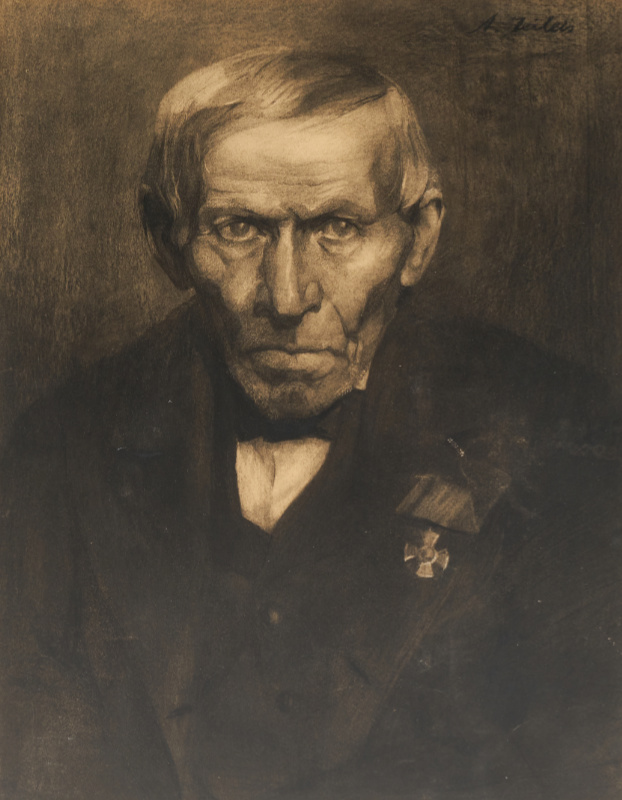
Gentleman with medal, Charcoal, 1908, ca. 52x40 cm

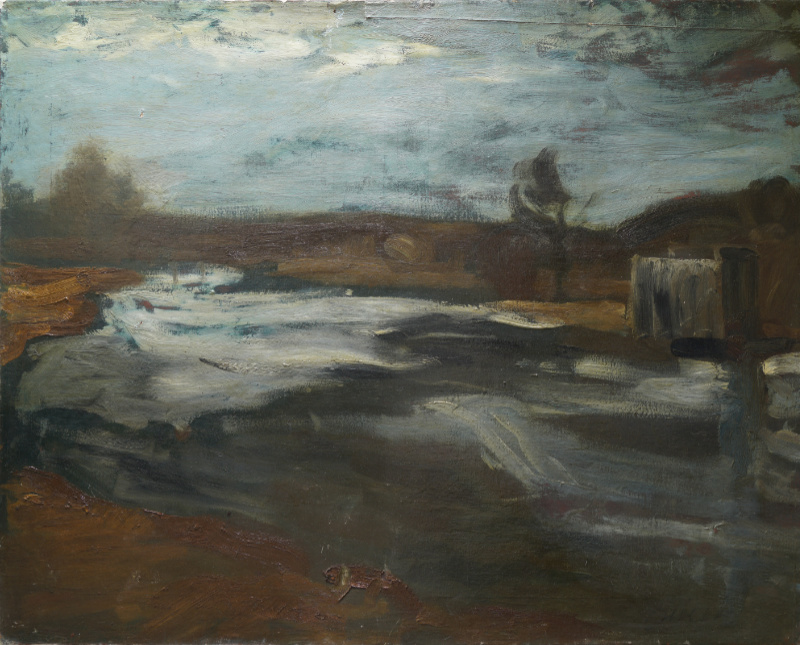
Landscape at river Amper, 1912, Oil, ca. 80x100 cm

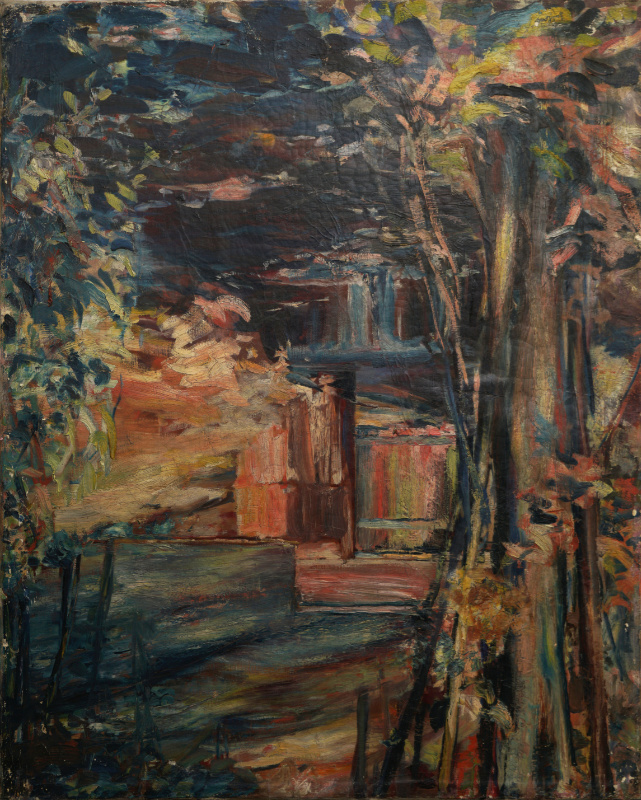
Waterfall without location, 1912, Oil, 101x81 cm

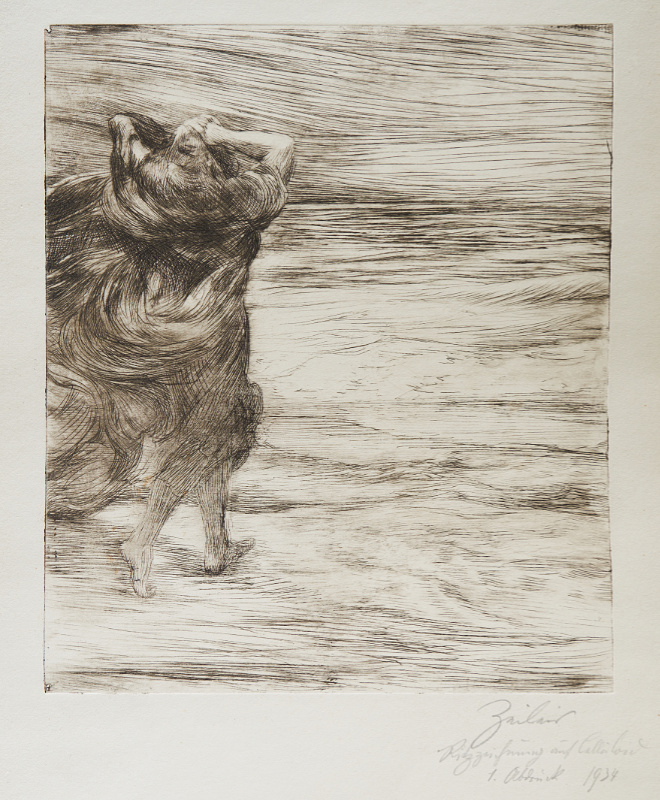
Study of a Woman, 1916, Oil print, ca. 24x20 cm

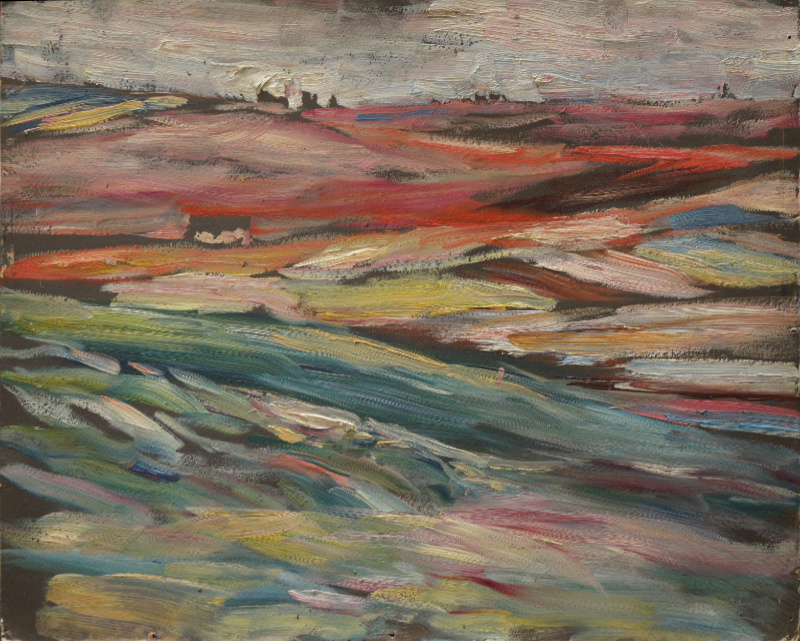
Landscape sketch, 1916, Oil, ca. 39x49 cm

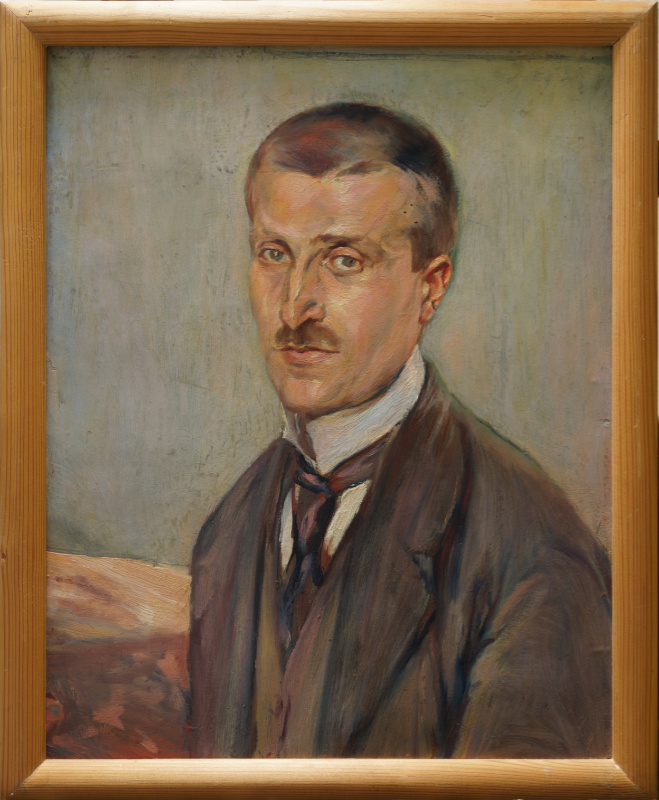
Self-Portrait, 1920, Oil, ca. 48x38 cm

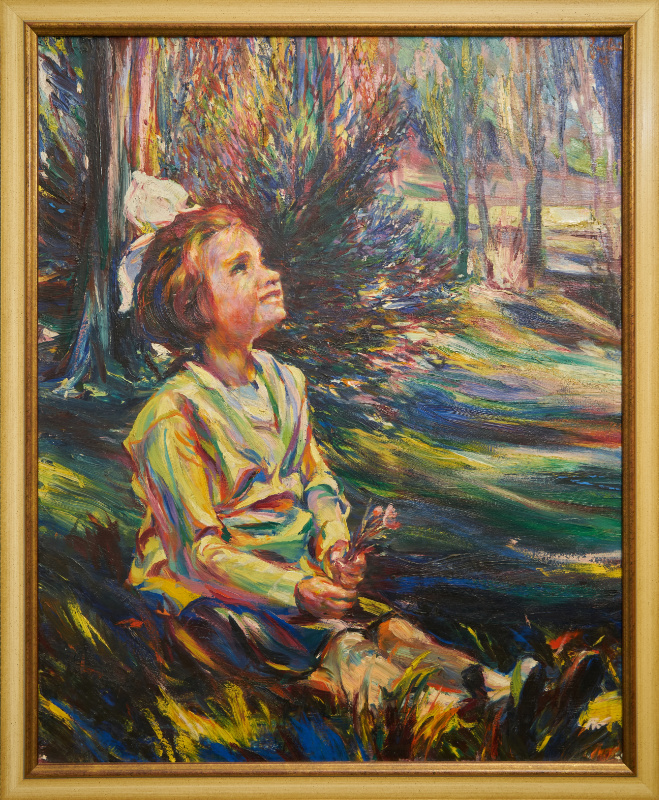
Anneliese Zeileis, daughter of the artist, 1926, Oil, ca. 79x64 cm

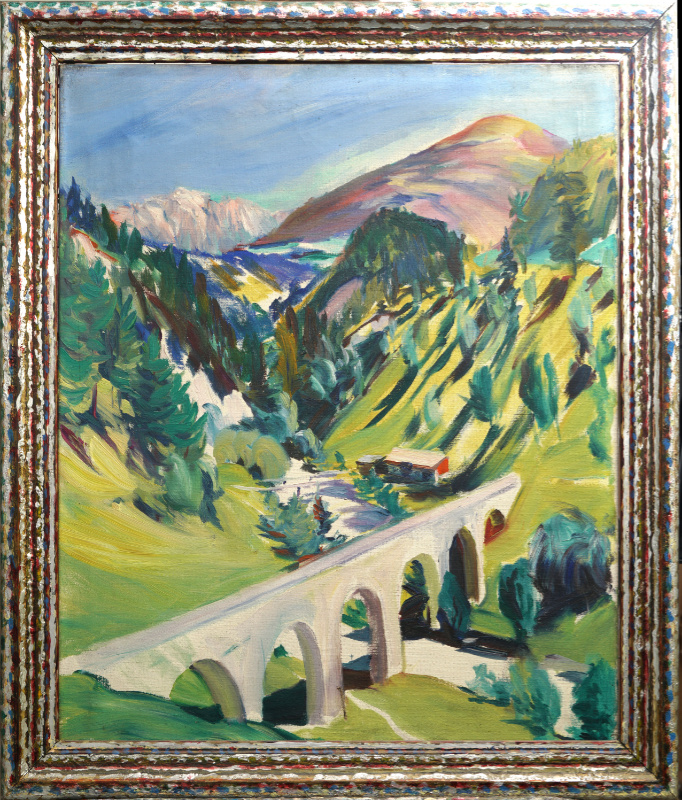
Stubaital, 1926, Oil, ca. 79x64 cm

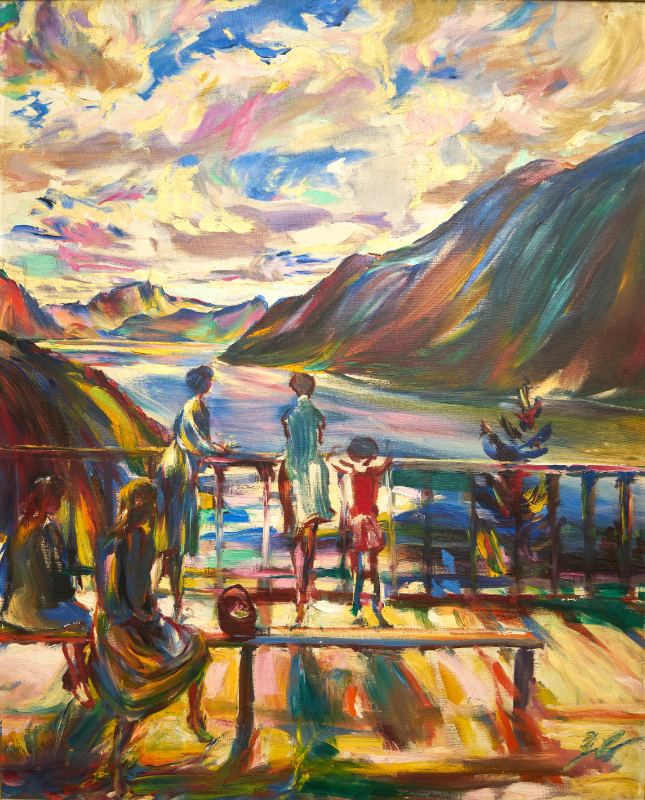
Landscape on Lake Lucerne, 1927, Oil, ca. 98x79 cm

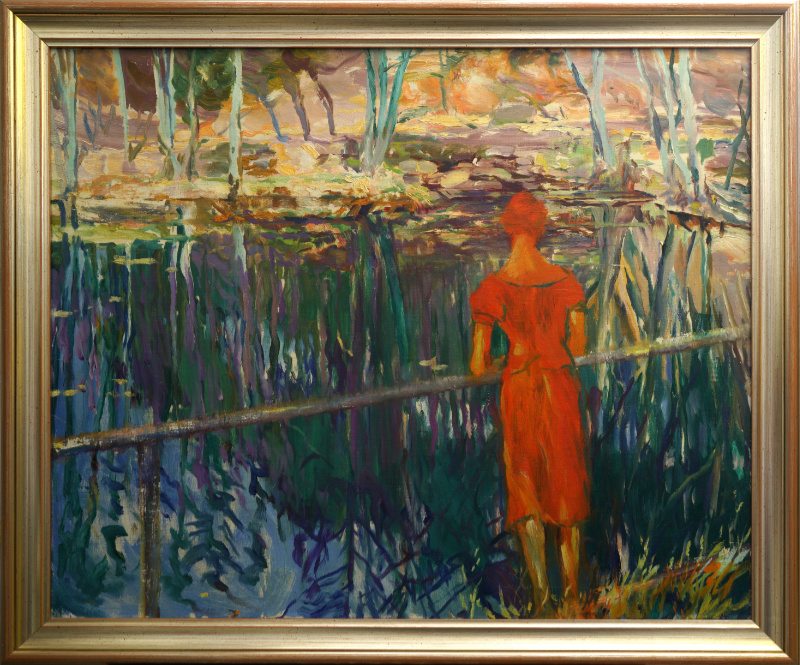
Forest lake with red figure, 1927, Oil, ca. 64x79 cm

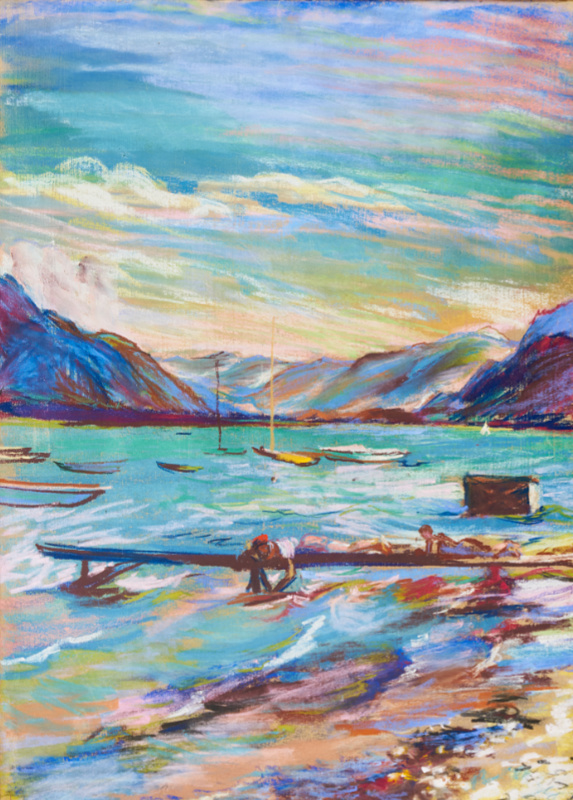
Fraueninsel, 1928, Tempera, ca. 67x47

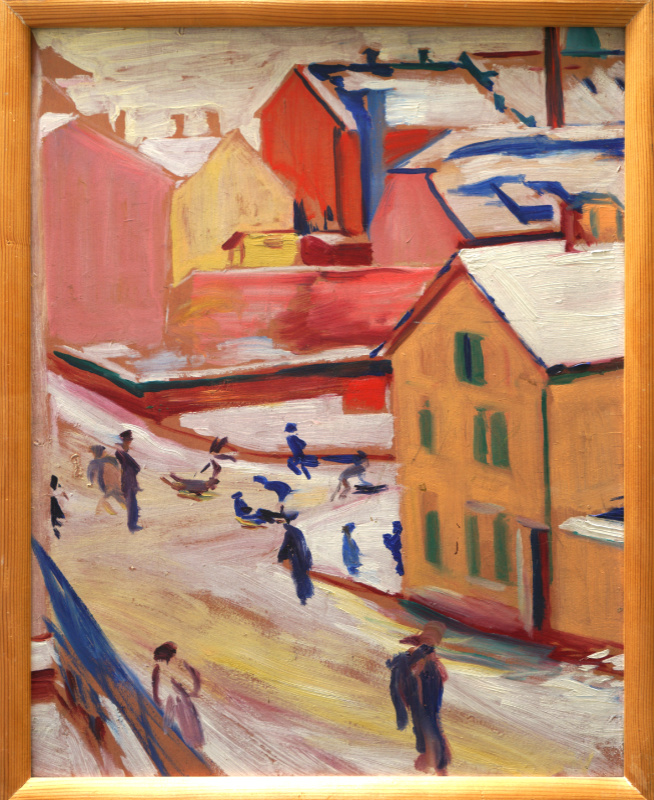
Neustadt corner Sauterstraße-Lindenstraße, 1929, oil, ca. 48x38 cm

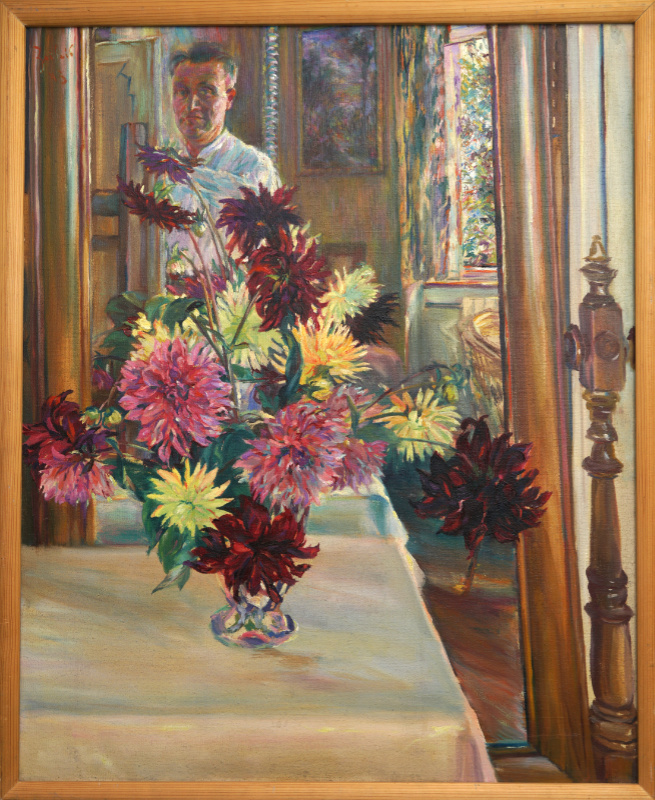
Bouquet of dahlias with artist in the background, 1935, Oil, 79x64 cm

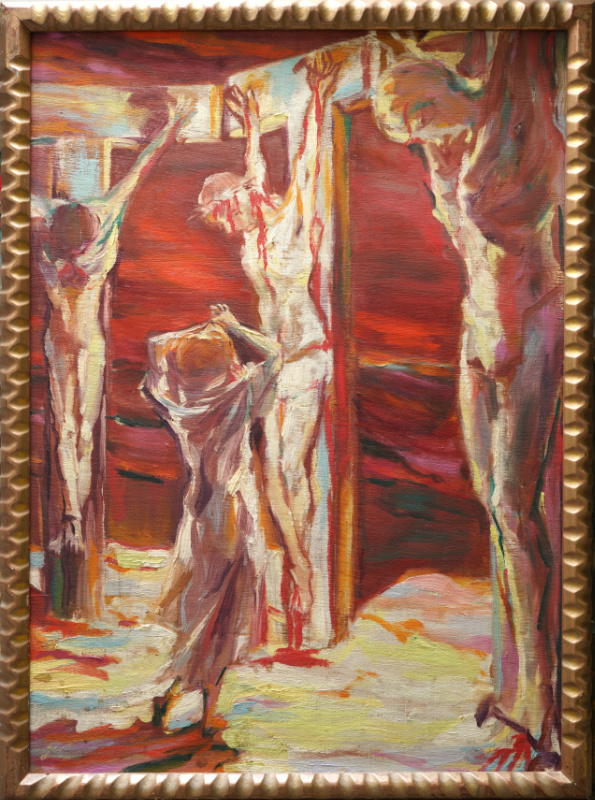
Crucifixus, 1938, Oil, ca. 71x52 cm

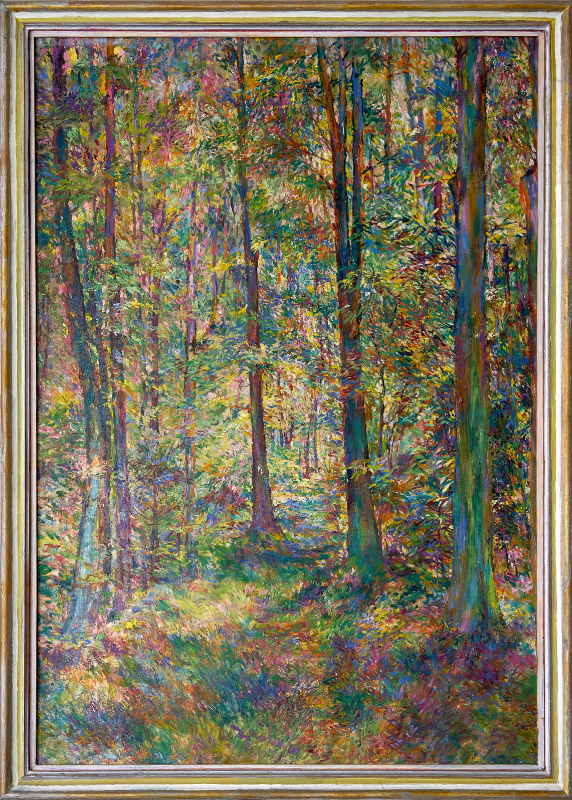
Forest interior,1945, Oil, ca. 97x67 cm

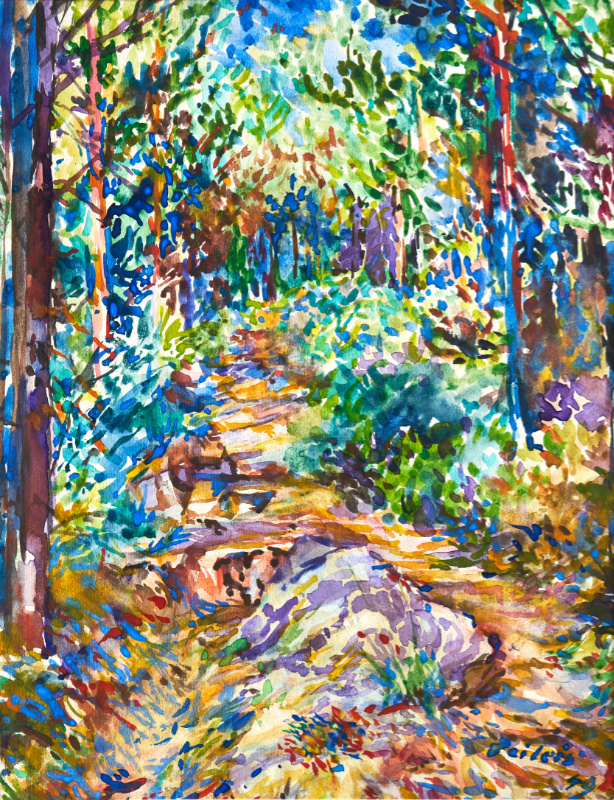
Steep forest path in Längstal, 1949, watercolor, ca. 36x28 cm

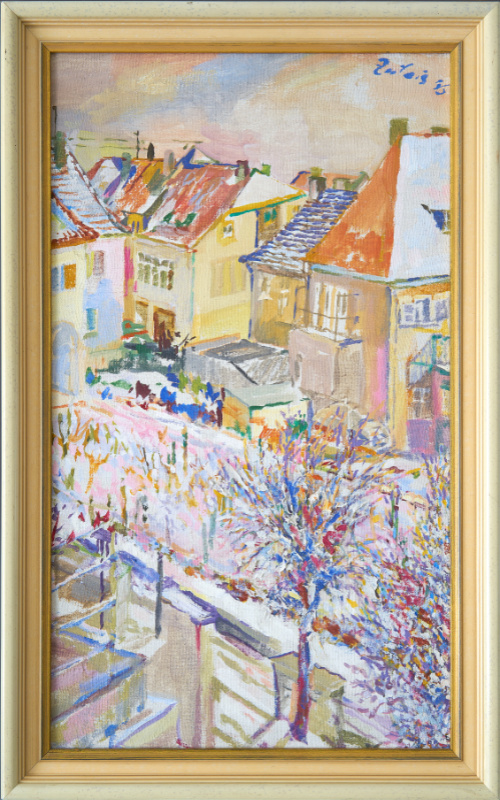
View of street in Hambach, 1955, Oil, ca. 62x35 cm

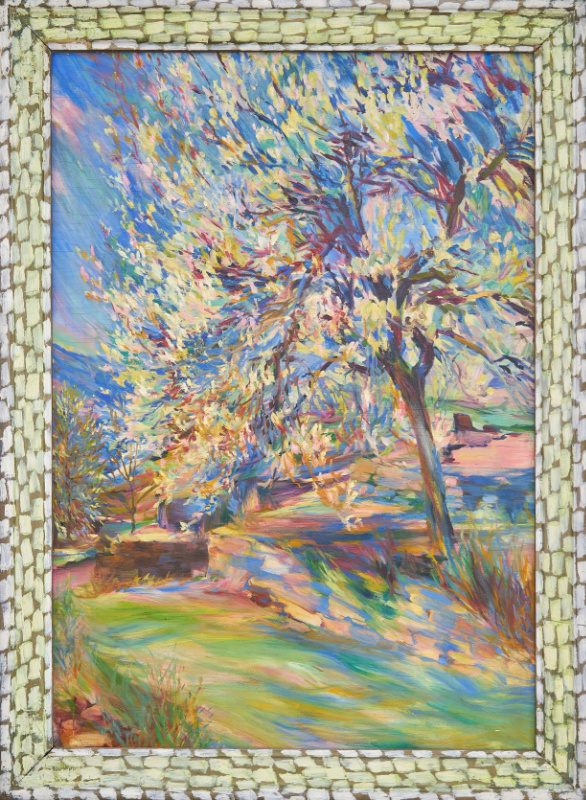
Blooming magnolia, 1955, Oil, ca. 95x66 cm

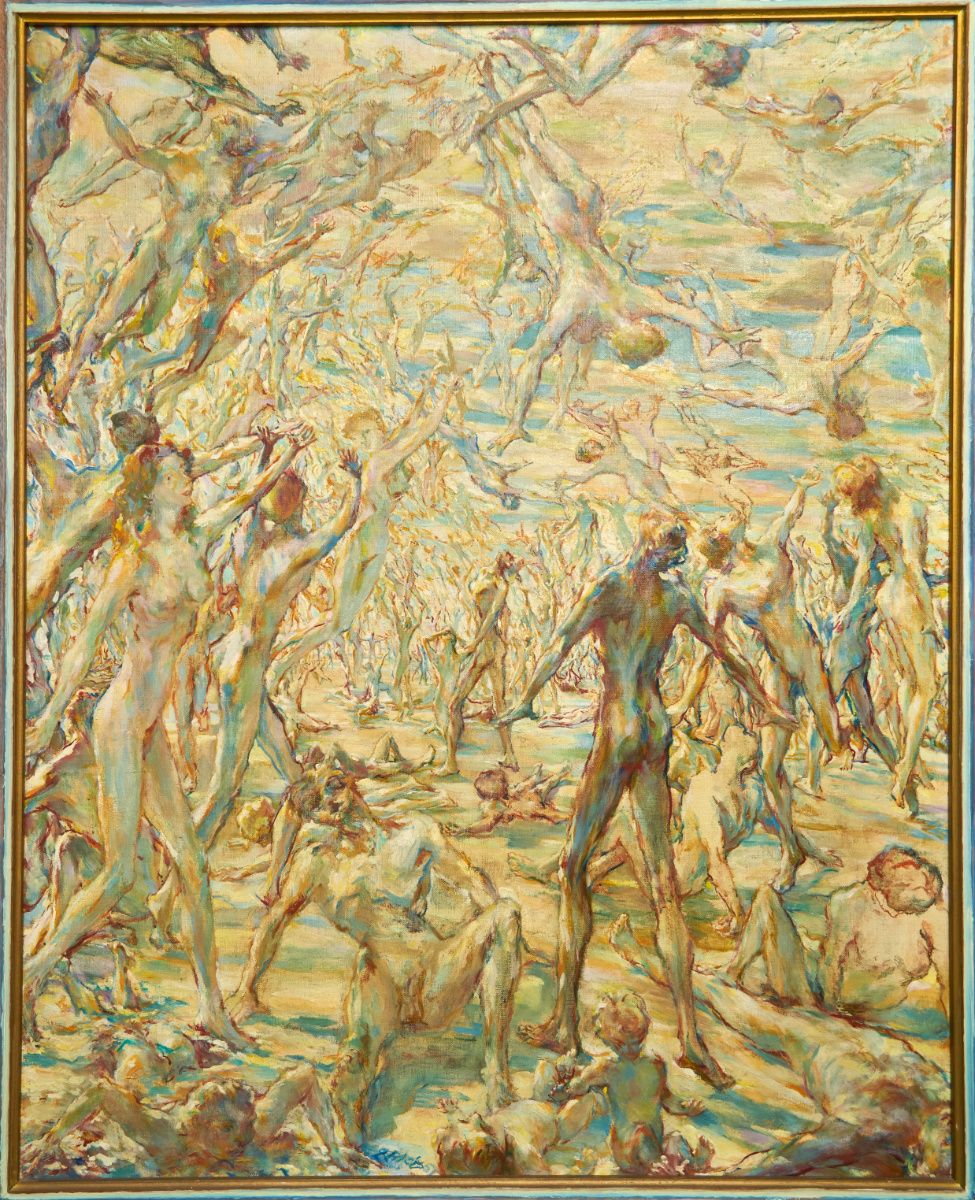
Resurrection II, 1956, Oil, 98x79 cm

== Zeileis' paintings in public ownership ==
- Palatinate Evangelical Church: Portrait of Church President Fleischmann 1952 (oil)
- Humanist grammar school in Neustadt (Weinstraße) (Kurfürst Ruprecht Gymnasium zu Neustadt (Weinstraße)): Portrait of Richard Wagner 1933 (oil).
- Humanist grammar school in Neustadt (Weinstraße) (Kurfürst Ruprecht Gymnasium zu Neustadt (Weinstraße)): Self-portrait from 1917 (oil) Quarry near Hambach from 1935 (oil).
- City of Dachau: Dachau Court Garden 1912 (oil), Upper Bavarian moor landscape 1912 (oil), Landscape with farmhouse 1913 (oil).
- District Savings Bank (Kreissparkasse) Bad Dürkheim: View over Neustadt from the Vogelsang in 1927 (oil).
