= Gabriel von Hackl =

German painter (1843–1926)

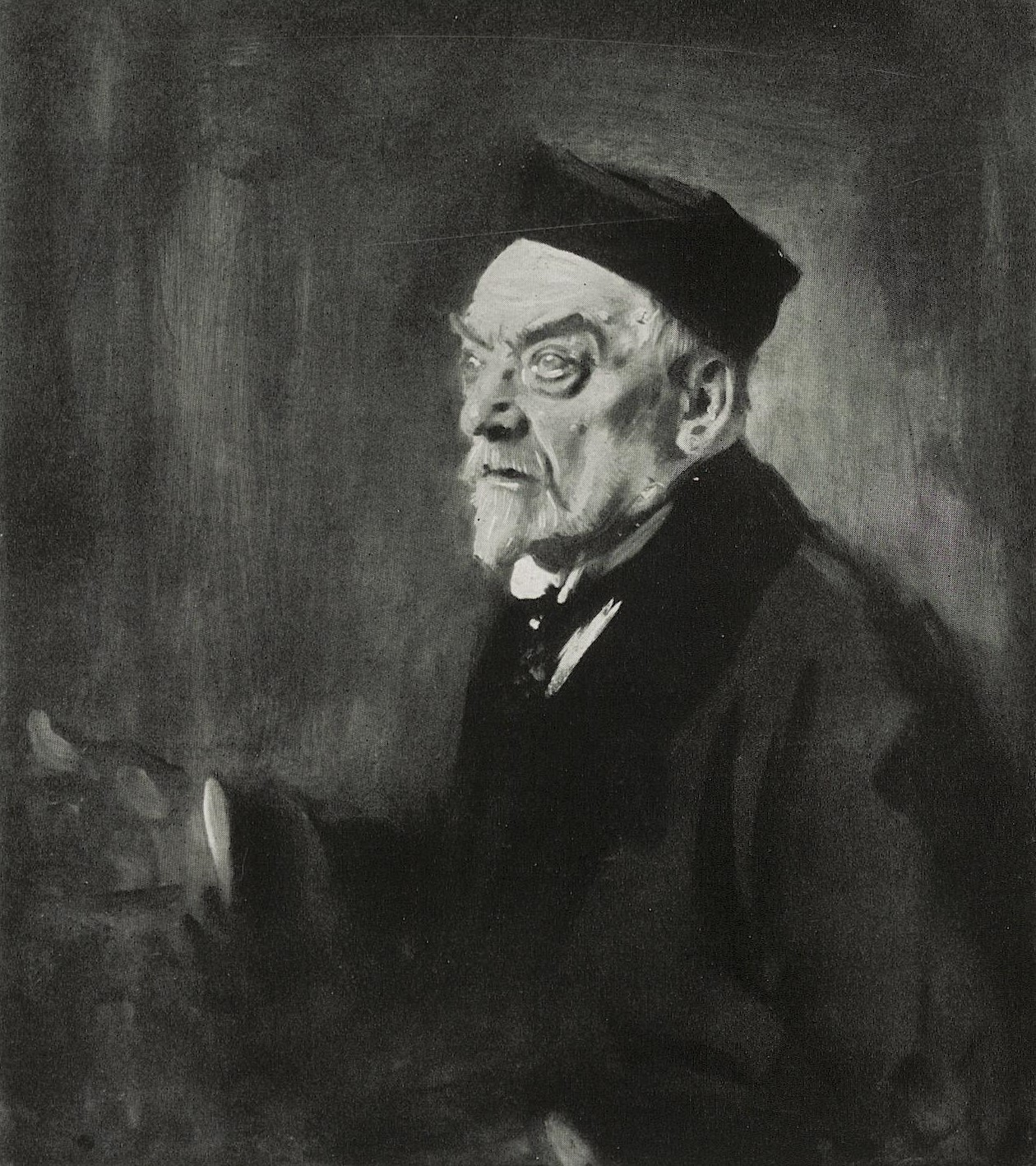
Gabriel von Hackl, by an unknown artist, undated

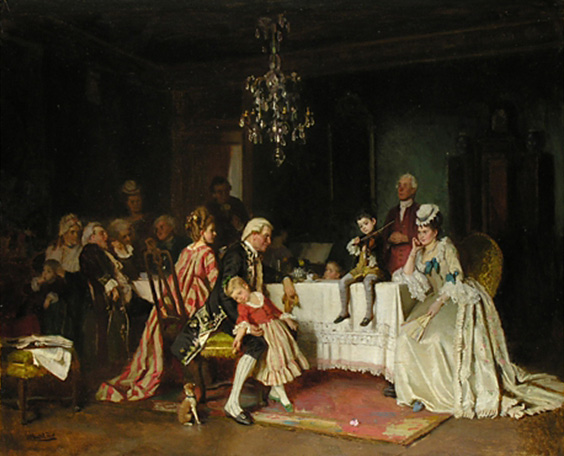
Das Wunderkind, 1874

Gabriel von Hackl (24 March 1843 – 5 June 1926) was a German historicist painter.

== Life and work ==
He was born in Maribor, Austrian Empire. A surgeon's son, he attended the gymnasium in his home town and the city school in Graz. To fulfil his father's wishes he then studied anatomy, archaeology and drawing at the University of Vienna. In 1865 he moved to Munich, at whose Akademie der Bildenden Künste he studied under Alexander Wagner and Carl Theodor von Piloty. He then took a place at the Münchner Kunstgewerbeschule and married Sophie Schmid.

In 1878 he became a professor and lecturer in drawing at the Münchner Kunstakademie, holding the position until 1919. His colleagues there included Franz von Stuck and Wilhelm von Diez. He was a member of the Luitpold-Gruppe, founded in 1896 as a sub-division of the Münchner Künstlergenossenschaft. The Luitpold-Gruppe also included Hugo Bürgel (its president), Walter Firle, Fritz Baer, Karl Marr, Johann Sperl and Wilhelm Leibl. Several artists trained by Hackl found success, though he had no lasting success with his own work, which still occasionally appears at auction. He died on 5 June 1926 in Munich.

== Notable pupils ==
- 1880: Pius Ferdinand Messerschmitt
- 1884: Albin Egger-Lienz, Anton Ažbe
- 1885: Max Slevogt
- 1887: Richard Riemerschmid
- 1888: Leo Putz
- 1889: Wilhelm Thöny
- 1890: Franz Marc
- 1891: Hans von Hayek
- 1897: Hans Purrmann
- 1905: Otto Obermeier
- 1906: Alfons Zeileis
- 1914: Henry Ives Cobb, Jr

== Works in public collections ==
- Museum Georg Schäfer, Schweinfurt
- Kunsthistorisches Museum, Vienna
- Neue Pinakothek, Munich
- Steiermärkisches Landesmuseum Joanneum, Graz

== Exhibitions ==
- 1891: Jahresausstellung der Genossenschaft der Bildenden Künstler Wiens und der Gesellschaft der Freunde Junger Kunst, Baden-Baden
- 2006: Zur Natur des Menschen. Genremalerei des 19. und frühen 20. Jahrhunderts, Neue Galerie am Landesmuseum Joanneum, Graz

== Literature ==
- Gabriel von Hackl. In: Ulrich Thieme, Felix Becker u. a.: Allgemeines Lexikon der Bildenden Künstler von der Antike bis zur Gegenwart. Band 15, E. A. Seemann, Leipzig 1922, S. 416
