= Robert Schade =

American painter

- Born: 1861; Tarrytown, New York, U.S.
- Died: 1912 (aged 50–51); Tarrytown, New York, U.S.
- Education: Milwaukee Art Association, Academy of Fine Arts Munich
- Known for: landscape painting, still lifes, portraits

Robert Schade (1861 – 1912) was an American painter.

== Biography ==
Schade was son of the Pomeranian immigrants August and Augusta Schade, who settled down in Milwaukee in 1863. At the age of 15 he started his studies of art at Milwaukee Art Association, where he was taught by Henry Vianden, who inspired him like Robert Koehler and Carl von Marr to finish his studies at Academy of Fine Arts Munich. When he returned to the United States, he taught at the Milwaukee art school and became a member of the American Panorama Company in 1885. Edward Steichen was one of his trainees. Schade was founding member of the Society of Milwaukee Artists, today Wisconsin Painters and Sculptors.

He painted predominantly portraits, still lifes and landscapes. One of his best known paintings shows the Peshtigo Fire, that he witnessed at the age of 11.
