= Schade =

Schade is a surname. Notable people with the surname include:

- Betty Schade, German-born American actress of the silent era
- Claire Schade (1893–1991), American vaudeville actress
- Doris Schade, German actress
- Fritz Schade, German-born American actor of the silent era
- Hartmut Schade, German football player
- Henry A. Schade, United States Navy officer, naval architect, and professor
- Herbert Schade, West German athlete
- Horst Schade (1922–1968), West German football player
- Kevin Schade, German football player
- Louis F. Schade, American defense attorney for Henry Wirz at the Andersonville Trial
- Michael Schade, Canadian operatic tenor
- Otto H. Schade, German-American television pioneer
- Robert Schade (1861–1912), American painter
- Victoria L. Schade, American politician

== See also ==
- Schade Brewery (Schade Towers), Spokane, Washington, US
