= Fanny Inama von Sternegg =

Austrian portrait and still life painter (1870–1928)

Franziska Maria Emilie Amalie Inama von Sternegg (2 July 1870, in Innsbruck – 9 November 1928, in Innsbruck) was an Austrian portrait, still life, and history painter whose works were exhibited at the KunstHausWien, the Neue Künstlervereinigung München, and the Louisiana Purchase Exposition. She studied under Walter Thor and Walter Firle, and was the daughter of Theodor Inama von Sternegg.
