= Frank Enders =

American painter (1860–1921)

- Born: 1860; Milwaukee, Wisconsin, U.S.
- Died: 1921 (aged 60–61)
- Education: Royal Academy of Fine Arts, Munich
- Known for: painting, etching

Frank Enders (1860 – June 1921) was an American painter and etcher.

== Biography ==
Enders was born in Milwaukee, the son of a saloon owner in the city's German quarter. He was trained by Henry Vianden, and worked for him as a sign-painter. According to Hannah Heidi Levy's Famous Wisconsin Artists and Architects Enders worked in the shop of Henry Baumgaertner. At age 19 Enders traveled to Munich, Germany where he studied from 1879 to 1884 at the Royal Academy of Fine Arts with Alois Gabl and Wilhelm von Lindenschmit, especially history painting, genre works and landscape painting. Back in Milwaukee, he founded a studio at 55 Oneida Street. Later he was director of the art gallery of exhibition building in Milwaukee.

== Death ==
The death of Frank Enders was published in the Eau Claire Leader newspaper on July 1, 1921. The death notice is dated June 29 and stated that Ender "belonged to the original artists colony established in the '1990s'."
