= Theodor Inama von Sternegg =

German-Austrian political scientist and economist (1843–1908)

Karl Theodor Ferdinand Michael Inama von Sternegg (20 January 1843, in Augsburg – 28 November 1908, in Innsbruck) was a German-born Austrian political scientist, statistician, and economist, who served as the second president of the International Statistical Institute from 1899 to 1908, and was a member of the Austrian Imperial Council, the Austrian Academy of Sciences, the Accademia dei Lincei, the Prussian Academy of Sciences, the Bavarian Academy of Sciences and Humanities, and the German National Academy of Sciences Leopoldina. He was the father of painter Fanny Inama von Sternegg.
