= Wilhelm Thöny =

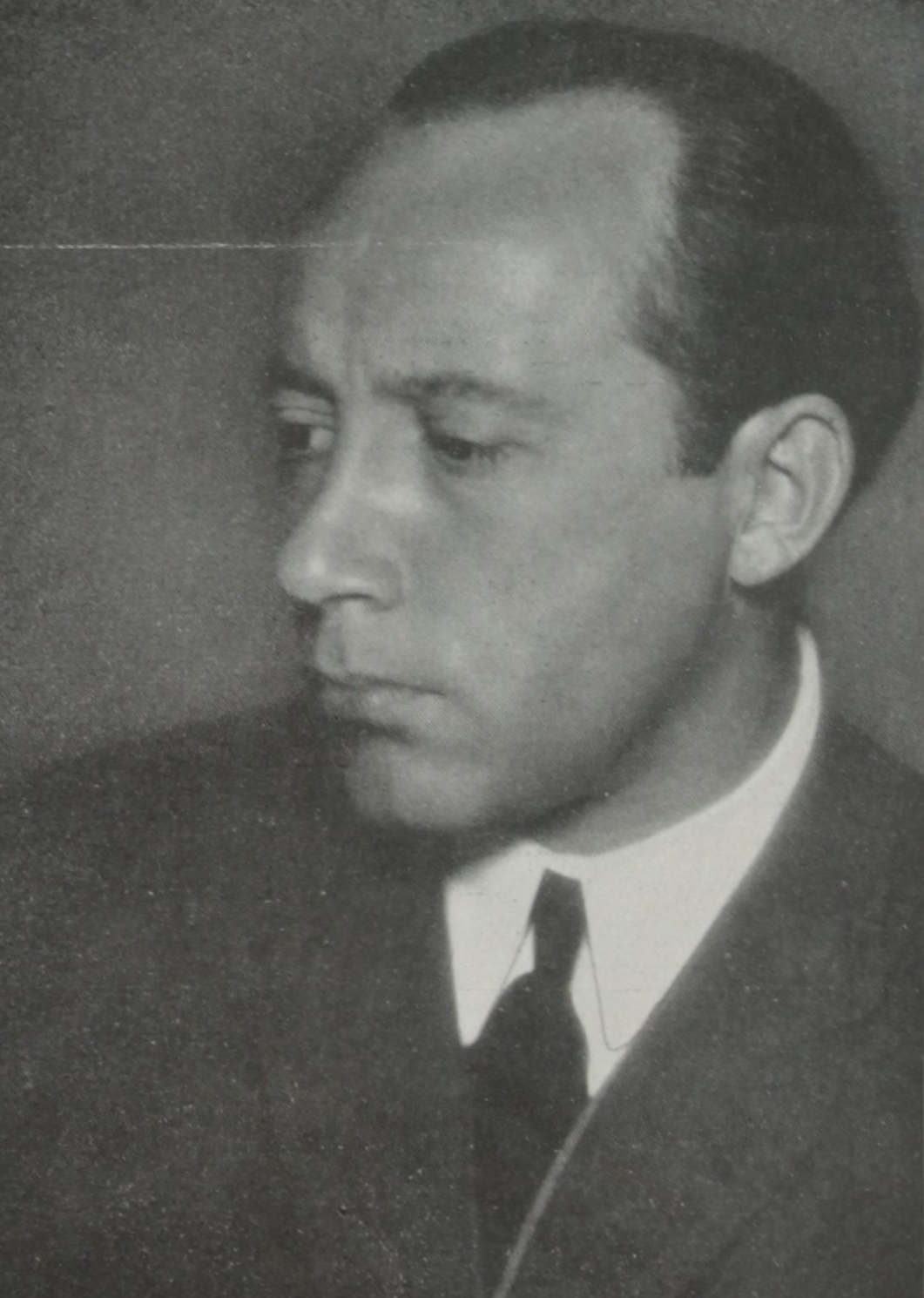
Wilhelm Thöny (1920s); photographed by Richard Gerstenberger (1877-1929)

Wilhelm Thöny (10 February 1888, Graz - 1 May 1949, New York City) was an Austrian painter, illustrator, graphic artist and etcher.

== Biography ==
He attended the Landeskunstschule (State Art School) in Graz and, from 1908 to 1912, studied at the Academy of Fine Arts Munich with Angelo Jank and Gabriel von Hackl. During this time, he also learned to sing and play the piano. He was one of the founding members of the Münchener Neue Secession, and became lifelong friends with the artist and writer, Alfred Kubin.

In 1915, he volunteered to join the Graz Rifle Regiment #3. In 1916, he was allowed to visit the prisoner-of-war camps in Broumov, Kleinmünchen (near Linz) and Mauthausen, where he made portrait studies of the prisoners; mostly Italian, Albanian, Romanian, and Greek. In 1917, he became a Lieutenant in the Reserve and was stationed on the Italian Front, where he created large-scale depictions of the battles fought there. Many were reproduced as postcards; sold to benefit the regiment's Widows and Orphans Fund. These may now be seen in the Stadtmuseum Graz. Later, he illustrated a history of his regiment — although he was never designated as an official war artist. In this regard, he is often confused with Eduard Thöny (no relation), who was an official artist with the press corps.

After the war, he returned to Graz, where he became the founder and first President of the Sezession Graz (1923); a modern artists' association. In 1925, he married Thea Herrmann-Trautner, daughter of the American expatriate painter, Frank Herrmann (1866–1942), and sister of the caricaturist Eva Herrmann. After a short stay in Paris, in 1929, he produced his first large oil painting, Ile de la Cité. This led to a fascination with large cities so, in 1931, he left Graz and lived in Paris until 1938, precipitating a major change in his style. His summers were spent on the Côte d’Azur, where some of his most significant works were produced. After a visit to Manhattan in 1933, he began to produce paintings with New York motifs. During these years, he exhibited widely, receiving a gold medal at the Exposition Internationale des Arts et Techniques dans la Vie Moderne in 1937. The following year, he and Thea moved to New York City.

On March 4, 1948, a warehouse fire destroyed over a thousand of his graphics and paintings which were being stored for an exhibition. This was the bulk of his life's work. He fell into depression, from which he never recovered, until his death the following year.

In 1976, a street in the Donaustadt district of Vienna was named after him. His surviving works may be seen at the Neue Galerie Graz (which held a major retrospective in 2013), Österreichische Galerie Belvedere, and the Heeresgeschichtliches Museum in Vienna.

== Selected paintings ==
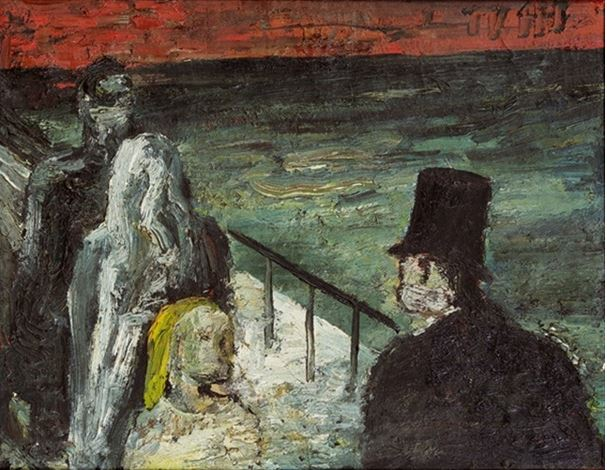
On the Bridge

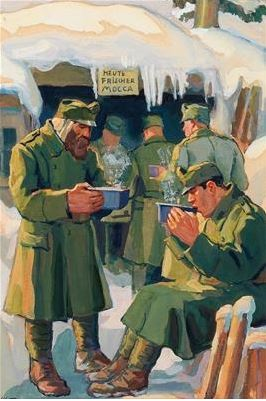
"Fresh Mocha Today"

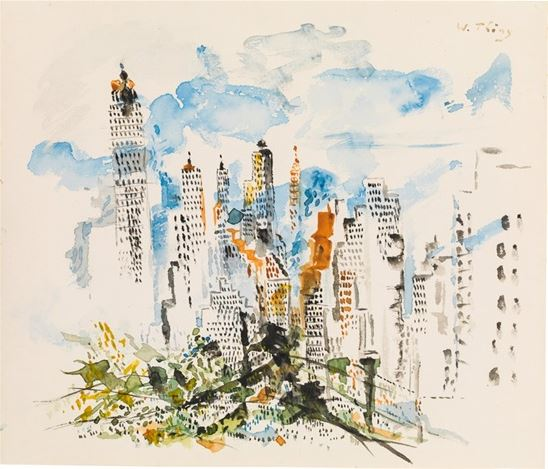
Fifth Avenue

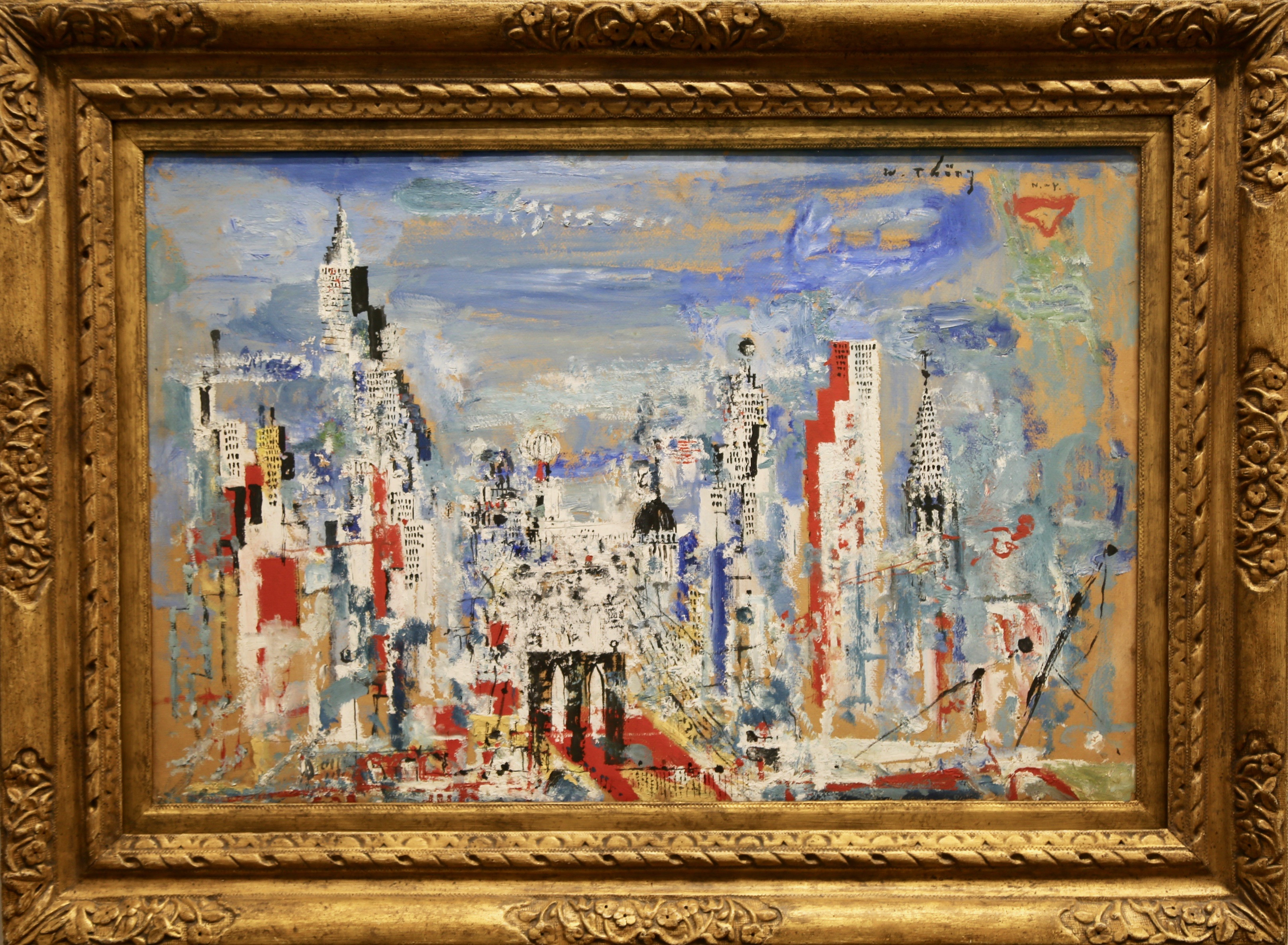
East River

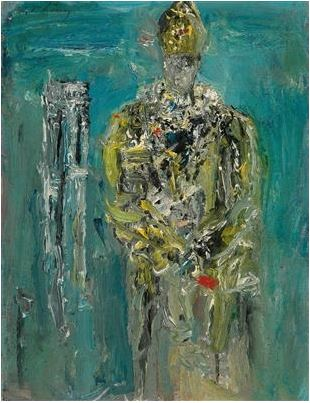
Cardinal
Jean Verdier

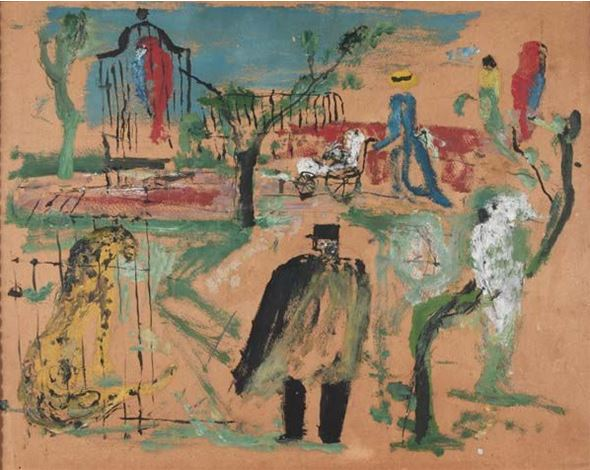
Le Jardin des Plantes
