= Pius Ferdinand Messerschmitt =

German painter

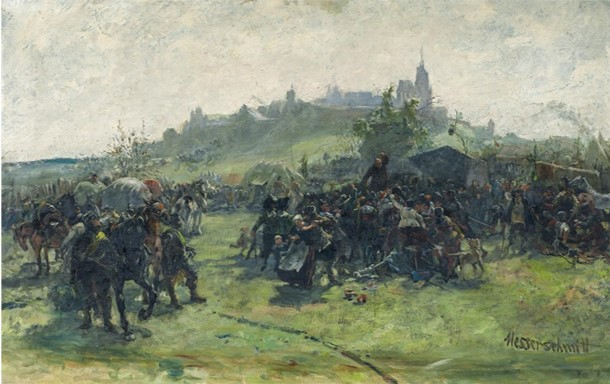
The Capuchin's Speech in Wallenstein's Camp

Pius Ferdinand Messerschmitt (30 May 1858, in Bamberg – 29 October 1915, in Munich) was a German painter, illustrator and watercolorist known for depicting genre and historical scenes, many of which include horses.

== Biography ==
He came from a family of shippers and merchants. His first painting lessons were at the "Schmidtschen Porzellanmalinstitut" (porcelain painting school) in Bamberg. He completed his education there at the Royal Arts and Crafts School and went to work for his family, trading in grain and produce, although he continued to paint in his spare time. His apprenticeship involved several stays abroad; in Neuchâtel (1874), Antwerp (1875/76) and Straßburg (1876). In 1878, he attended the Exposition Universelle in Paris.

That same year, his first illustrations appeared in the magazine Über Land und Meer (Over Land and Sea) and he won a Gold Medal from the Academy of Fine Arts, Munich, for his depiction of a scene from Wallenstein's Camp. As a result, he decided to pursue art professionally and enrolled at the academy, where he studied with Gabriel von Hackl and Gyula Benczúr. In 1882, he began private studies with Wilhelm Lindenschmit.

In 1894, he married Else Amalie Fellerer (1872–1919), whose father was a Hofrat at the Bavarian court, and opened his own studio. He also became a member of several artistic associations, including the Münchner Künstlergenossenschaft (Artists' Co-operative). In 1896, he joined its offshoot, the Luitpold-Gruppe, devoted to advancing modern trends. He became a professor at the Munich Academy in 1912 and, in 1914, he was named Secretary of the "Allgemeinen Deutschen Künstler Gruppe".

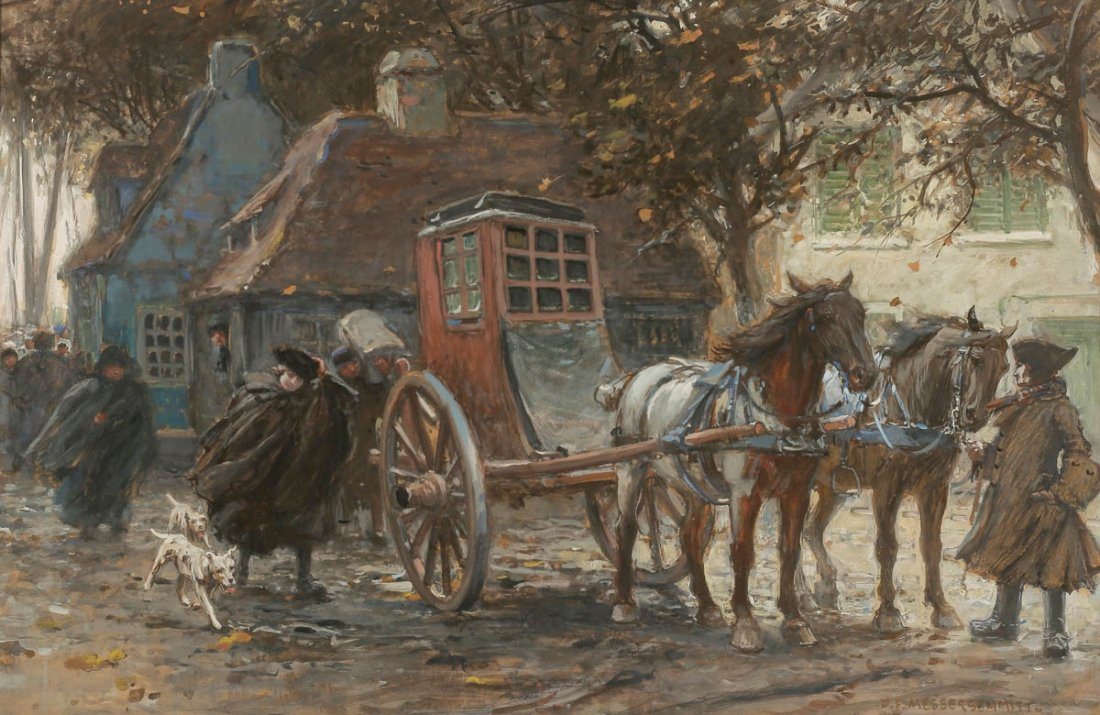
The Homecoming

He died unexpectedly in 1915. Else married the painter Carl von Marr the following year. He was distantly related to the aircraft designer, Willy Messerschmitt.

== Sources ==
- Ernst Viktor Tobler, "Pius Ferdinand Messerschmitt", in: Reclams Universum 32 (1916), Vol.14, pp. 829–832.
- Hans Fischer, "Pius Ferdinand Messerschmitt", in: Lebensläufe aus Franken, 7. Vol.2, 1922, pp. 280–288.
- "Pius Ferdinand Messerschmitt". In: Thieme-Becker: Allgemeines Lexikon der Bildenden Künstler von der Antike bis zur Gegenwart. Vol.XXIV, E. A. Seemann, Leipzig 1930, p. 433.
