= Henry Vianden =

German-American painter

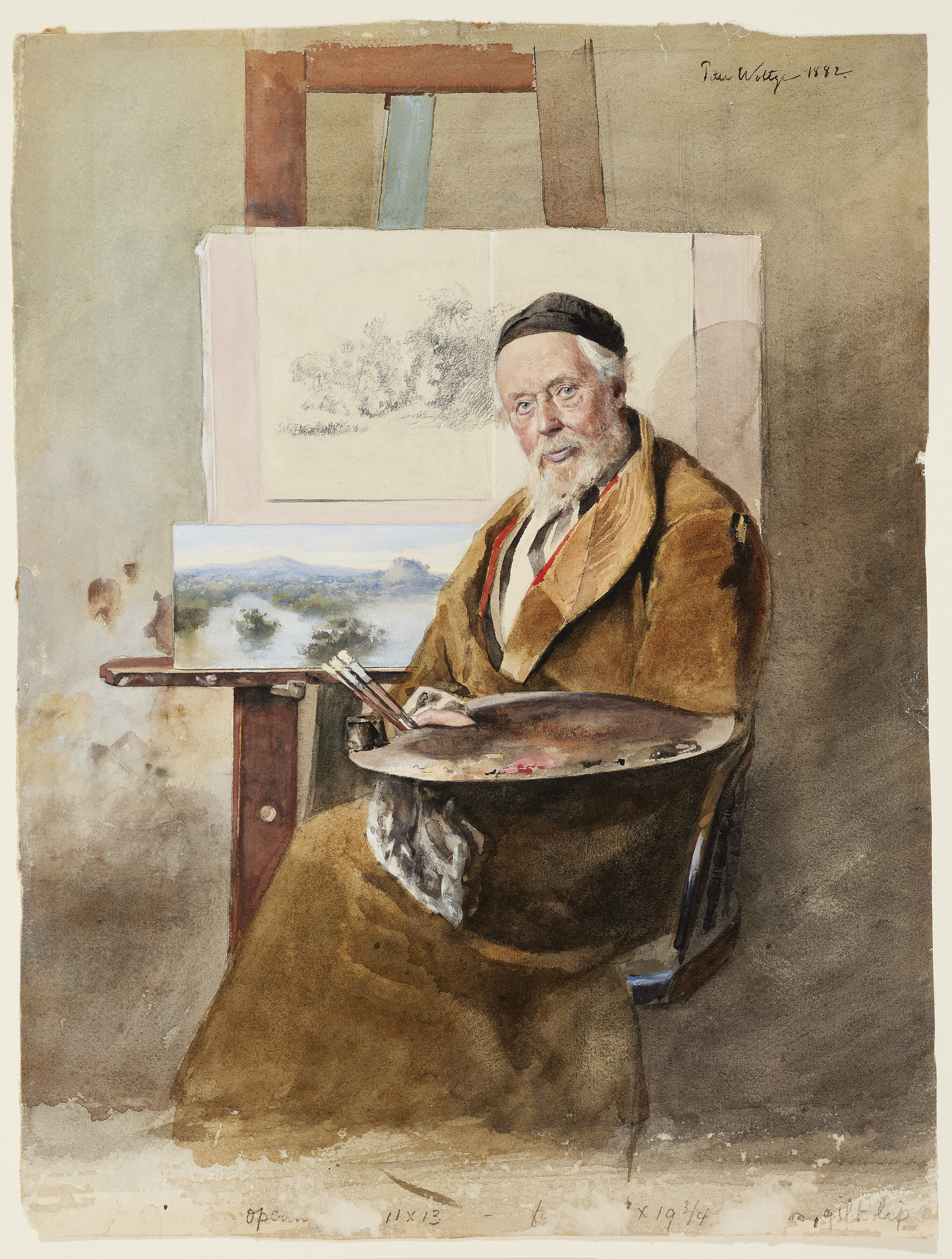
- Peter Woltze, Henry Vianden, 1882 (Milwaukee Art Museum)
- Born: Heinrich Vianden; July 9, 1814; Poppelsdorf
- Died: February 5, 1899 (aged 84) near Milwaukee
- Education: Academy of Fine Arts Munich, Royal Academy of Fine Arts Antwerp
- Known for: painting, lithography, engraving

Heinrich Vianden, better known as Henry Vianden (July 9, 1814 – February 5, 1899), was a German American painter, lithographer and engraver. He was nicknamed "The Bear" by his friends and is often considered as "father of Wisconsin art".

== Biography ==
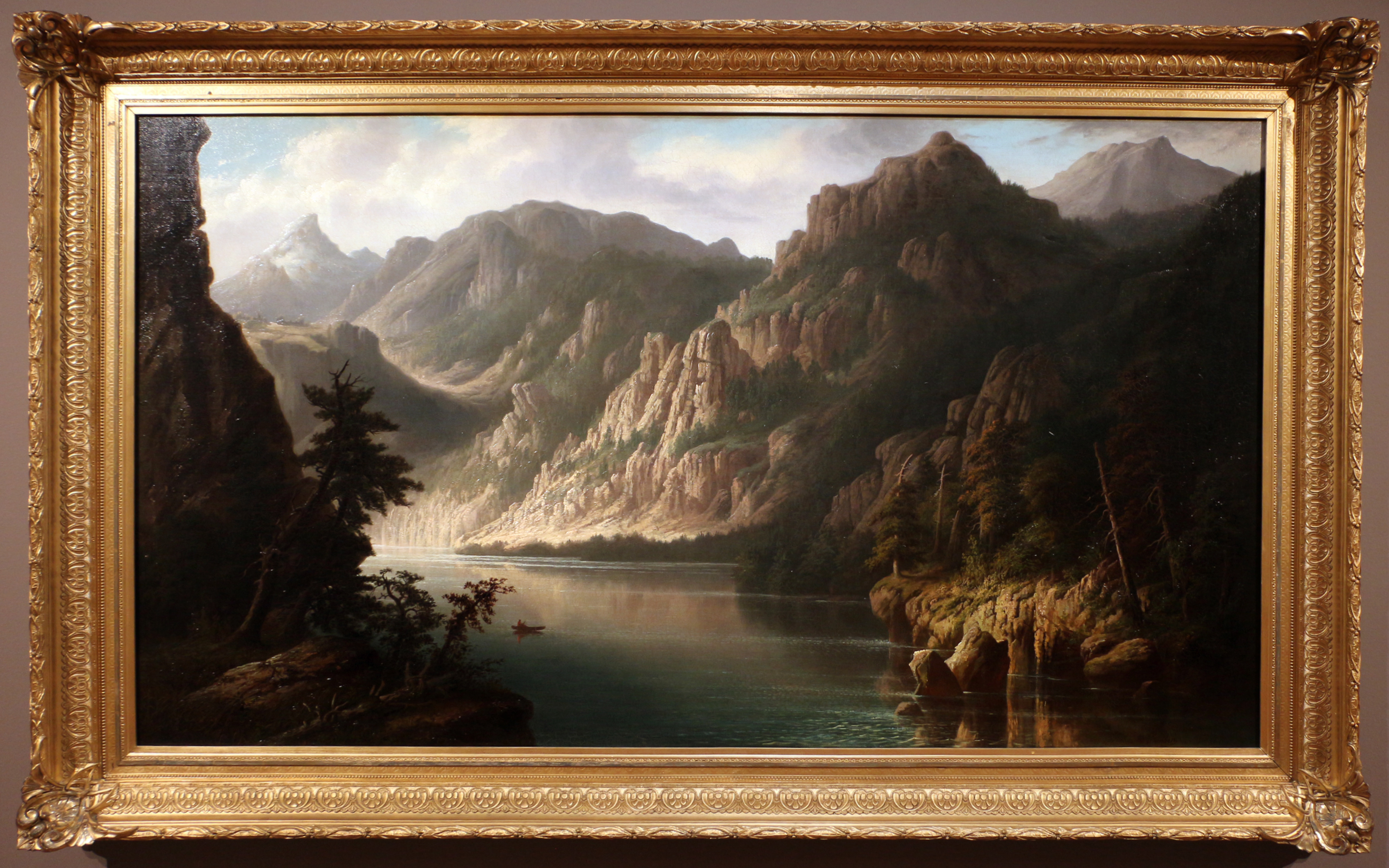
Landscape with Mountains and River, in the collection of the Milwaukee Art Museum

Vianden was born in Poppelsdorf, today a quarter of Bonn. He was the only child of the ceramic painter Wilhelm Joseph Vianden (1788–1818) and his wife Anna Maria, née Weyh (1788–1866). When he was five years old, his father died. At the age of 14, Vianden started a goldsmith training and did his studies of arts at the Royal Academy of Fine Arts in Munich from 1838 to 1841. At first he exhibited in Cologne in 1844. Also in 1844, he finished his studies in Antwerp for one and a half year, where he also worked with Frans-Andries Durlet. In 1845 he returned to Germany, where he lived at Große Brinkgasse 11 in Cologne. In November 1848 he married Magdalena Krüppel (b. 1811), daughter of a physician from Zülpich. They had four children, which all died in their childhood. Together with Magdalena he left Germany in May 1849 and came to New York City on July 4 of the same year. After a short stay, they moved to Wisconsin, where they stood near Burlington for a while, before they settled down in Milwaukee, and applied for US citizenship. His first exhibition in Milwaukee was in December 1849. In May 1850 they moved to a suburb, now part of Milwaukee, where he taught in his open air school near Root Creek. He also taught in his studio at 111 Mason Street, Milwaukee, and at Peter Engelmann's German-English Academy, today University School of Milwaukee, as well as at the German, French, and English Academy of Mathilde Franziska Anneke. Carl von Marr, Robert Koehler, Frank Enders, Robert Schade and Susan Stuart Frackelton were students of him. On June 5, 1860, his wife Magdalena abandoned him and returned to Germany. He applied for divorce in November 1861 and was divorced on February 15, 1862. In 1867 he remarried the German Fredericka Wollenzien (1837–1897). They had no children. At the age of 85 he died near Milwaukee due to a pleurisy. He sold part of his land to the Forest Home Cemetery in his lifetime, and is buried there. His house was demolished in 1922.
