= Otto Dill =

German painter

- Born: 4 June 1884; Neustadt an der Weinstraße, Germany
- Died: 6 July 1957 (aged 73); Bad Dürkheim, Germany
- Occupation: Painter

Otto Dill (4 June 1884 – 6 July 1957) was a German painter. His work was part of the art competitions at the 1928 Summer Olympics and the 1932 Summer Olympics.
