= Martin Schauß =

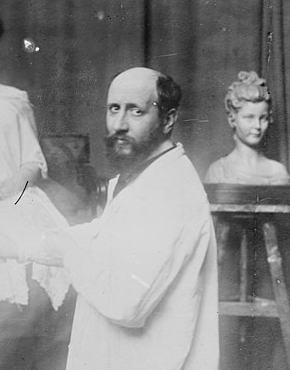
Martin Schauß in his studio

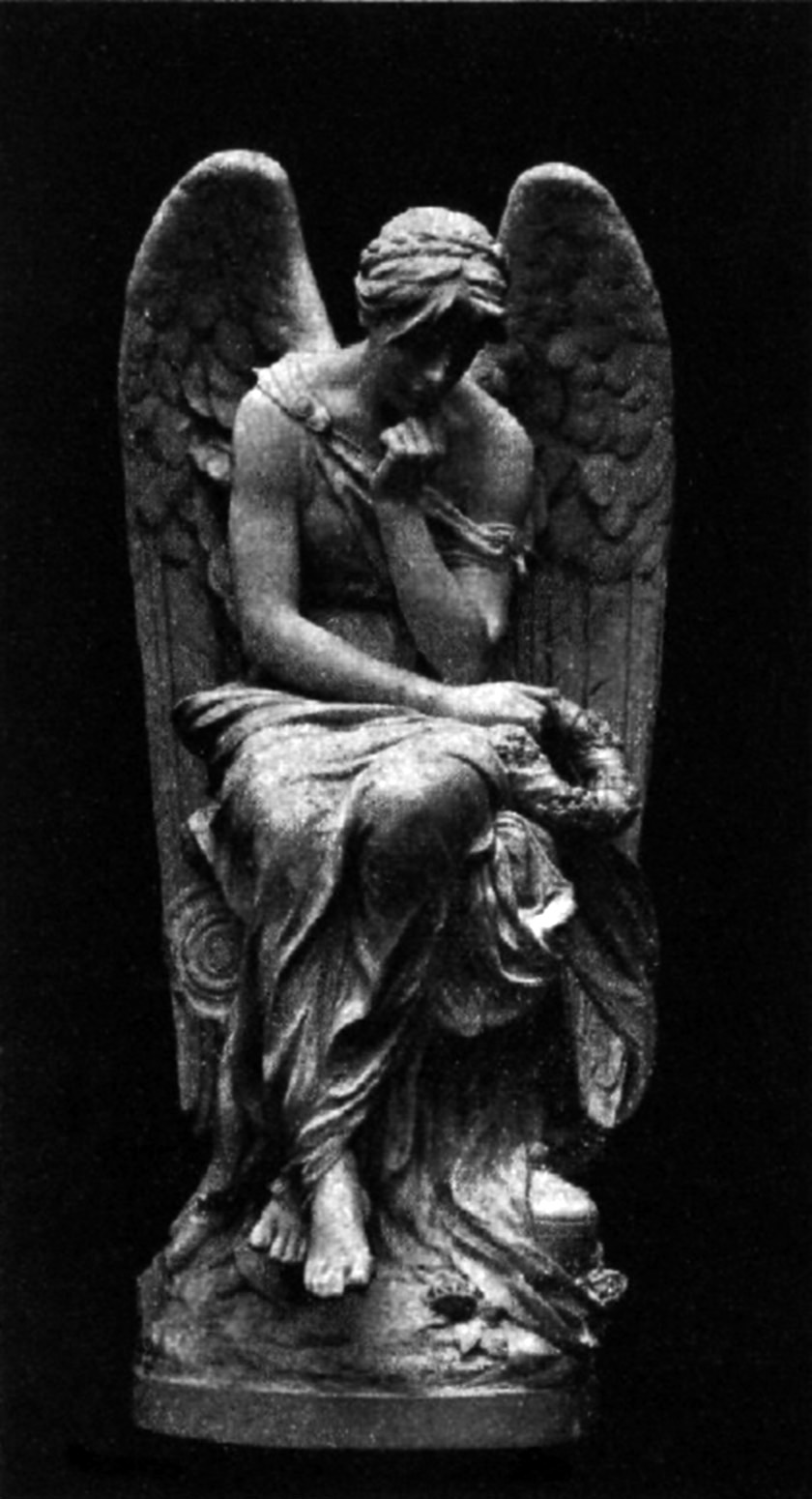
Angel of Peace (1899)

Ferdinand Theodor Martin Schauß (25 September 1867, Berlin - 24 January 1927, Berlin) was a German sculptor and medallist.

== Life and work ==
He was born to the merchant, Charles Emile Schauß (1834-1875) and his wife, Amelie Pauline Marie, née. Weiss (1846–1931). The portrait painter, Ferdinand Schauß, was his uncle. He initially served an apprenticeship at the Royal Porcelain Factory then, from 1888 to 1891, he studied sculpture at the Academy of Arts, with Fritz Schaper and Ernst Herter. This was followed by studies in Paris, from 1892 to 1895, with the medallists, Henri Chapu and Denys Puech, at the Académie Julian.

Back in Berlin, he worked at the porcelain factory for a year. In 1897, he won the "Grand State Prize" from the Prussian Academy of Arts and went to the Villa Strohl-Fern in Rome, where he spent a year and a half. After 1899, he worked as a freelance sculptor in Berlin's Schöneberg district. In 1900, he became a member of the Freemasons lodge, "Zum goldenen Pflug" (golden plow).

Since 1893, he had been showing his works at the Great Berlin Art Exhibition, and was elected to their "Admissions and Arrangement Commission" in 1905. Two years later, they presented a small retrospective of his sculptures and he received the "Gold Medal for Art" from Kaiser Wilhelm II. In 1915, he was elected Second Secretary to the board of the Berlin Sculptors' Association.

He was a supporter of polychrome sculpture, an idea being promoted by Georg Treu, and made several attempts to use colored materials; especially tinted wax. His efforts were later described as "technically valuable".

In 1905, he married Antonie Anna Hermine Kaysel (1881-1974), daughter of the politician, Otto Kaysel, and sister of the painter Ottilie Kaysel. They had two children. The marriage ended in divorce in 1918.
