= Robert Koehler =

American painter

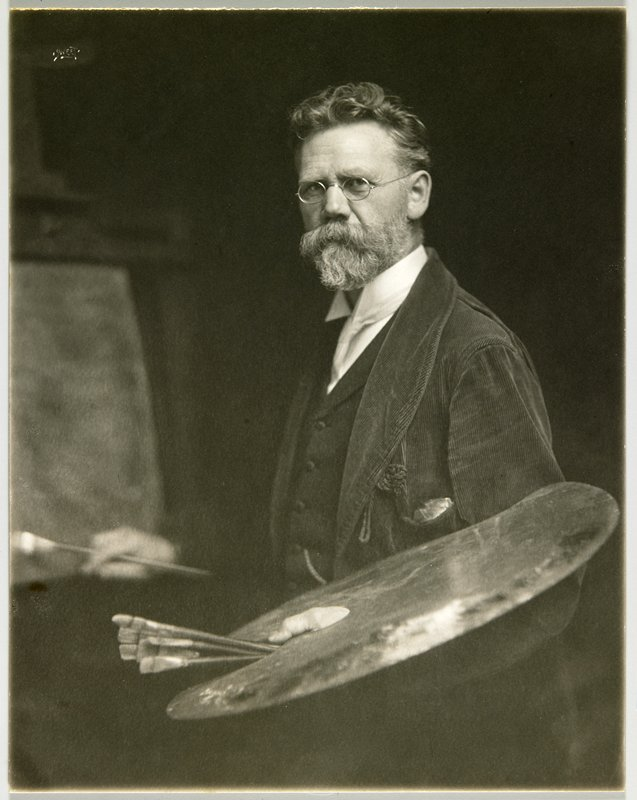
- Robert Koehler
- Born: November 28, 1850; Hamburg, German Confederation
- Died: April 23, 1917 (aged 66); Minneapolis, Minnesota, U.S.
- Education: Milwaukee: (H. Viandan, J. Roese); New York: ASL, NAD (Lemuel E. Wilmarth); Munich: Royal Academy (Alexander Strähuber, Ferdinand Barth, Ludwig von Löfftz, Franz von Defregger)
- Known for: Painting

Robert Koehler (November 28, 1850 – April 23, 1917) was a German-born painter and art teacher who spent most of his career in the United States.

== Biography ==
Koehler was born in Hamburg; his family spelled their name Köhler until they moved to Milwaukee, Wisconsin in 1854. There he attended the historic German-English Academy. He graduated from the academy in 1865, but continued his lessons with the school's drawing master, Henry Vianden, who had graduated from Munich's Royal Academy of Fine Arts. He apprenticed himself to a lithography firm.

In 1871, he went to New York City for eye surgery, and stayed to work as a lithographer. After studying drawing in the night classes of the National Academy of Design, Koehler went to Munich to study fine art at the Royal Academy in 1873, studying with Karl von Piloty and Ludwig Thiersch. He returned to New York after two years because of depleted funds. In 1879, he was able to return to Munich with means furnished by George Ehret, of New York, whose attention had been drawn to the young artists's ambition and capabilities. On his second trip, he studied under Ludwig Löfftz and Franz Defregger. His friendships with William Merritt Chase and Frank Duveneck date from this time.

Koehler's work while in Munich won him silver and bronze awards from the Academy, and Bavaria's Cross of the Order of St. Michael. Koehler then set himself up as head of a private art school; pupils included Alfons Mucha.

He began to exhibit in the National Academy, New York, in 1877. In 1885 he took charge of a private school of art in that city. He organized the American department of the international art exhibition at Munich in 1883, and was appointed by the Bavarian authorities to act in the same capacity in the exhibition of 1888.

In 1892 Robert Koehler returned to New York City to work as a portrait artist. The following year he moved to Minneapolis, Minnesota, accepting an offer to be the director of the Minneapolis School of Fine Arts (now the Minneapolis College of Art and Design). Koehler was also involved with the establishment of Minneapolis' Museum of Fine Art, now the Minneapolis Institute of Arts. He was a pioneer of art instruction and appreciation in the region.

Koehler was president of the Minnesota State Art Commission from 1903 to 1910, member of the Artists' League of Minneapolis, honorary member of the Minnesota State Art Society, honorary member of the Alumni Association of the Minneapolis School of Art, member of the Society of Western Artists, a lecturer on art history at the University of Minnesota, and member of the Institute des Beaux Arts et des Lettres of Paris, France. He received bronze and silver medals at the Munich Academy, honorable mention at the Paris World's Fair, 1889, bronze medal at the International Art Exhibition at Buenos Aires in 1910, and the cross of the Order of Saint Michael of Bavaria in 1888. Three notable paintings, "The Carpenter's Family," "At the Cafe," and his masterpiece "The Strike" were selected for display at the Columbian Exposition in Chicago in 1893.

Koehler continued working in Minneapolis, painting portraits and landscapes, teaching painting, and arranging exhibitions. He retired as director in 1914. He died in Minneapolis at age 66.

== Works ==
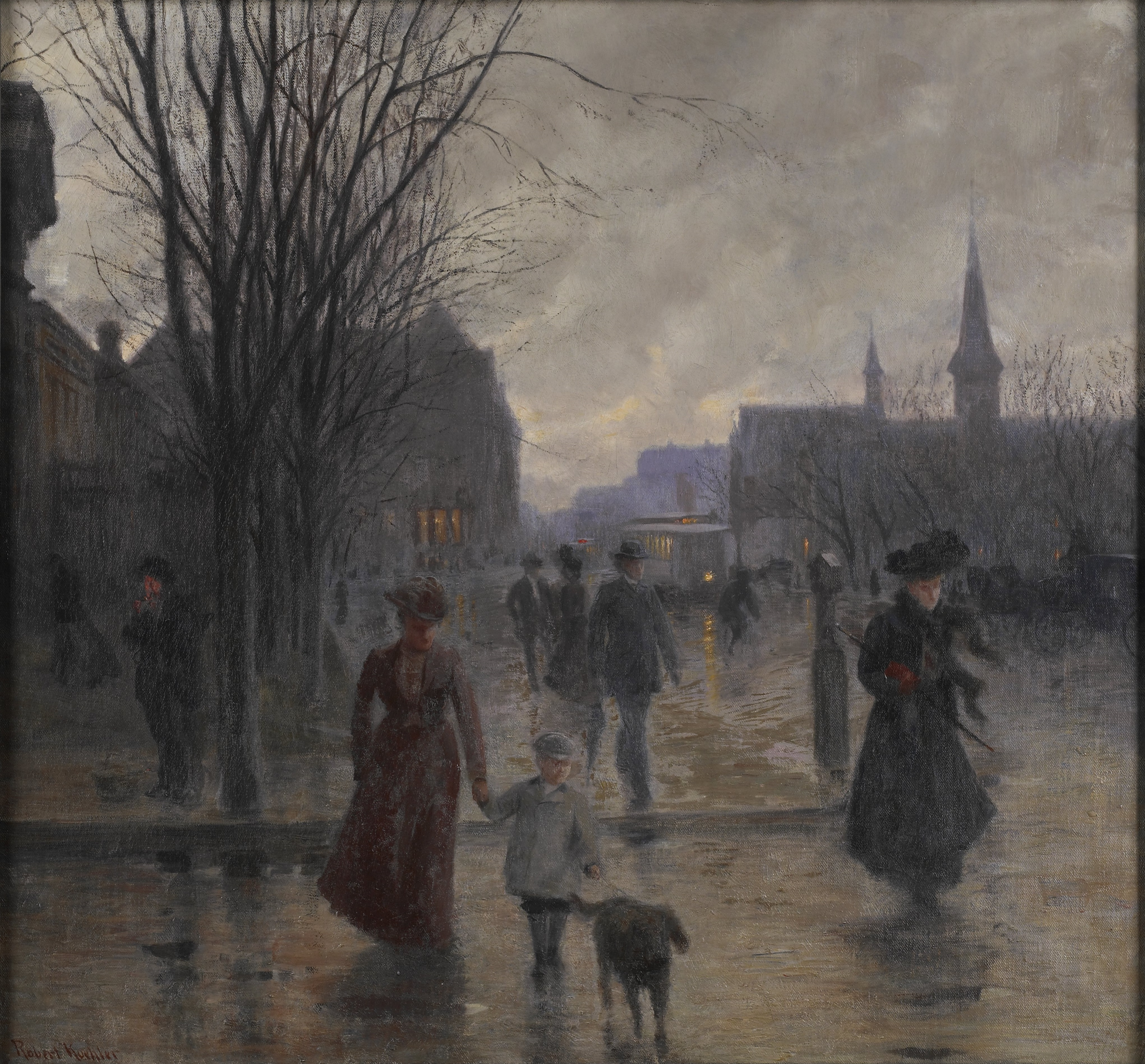
Rainy Evening on Hennepin Avenue c. 1902. The oil on canvas original is at the Minneapolis Institute of Arts

- Holy-day Occupation (1881, at the Pennsylvania Academy of the Fine Arts)
- Her Only Support (1883)
- The Socialist (1883, at the Deutsches Historisches Museum in Berlin)
- The Strike (1886, at the Deutsches Historisches Museum in Berlin)
- At the Cafe (c. 1887, private collection)
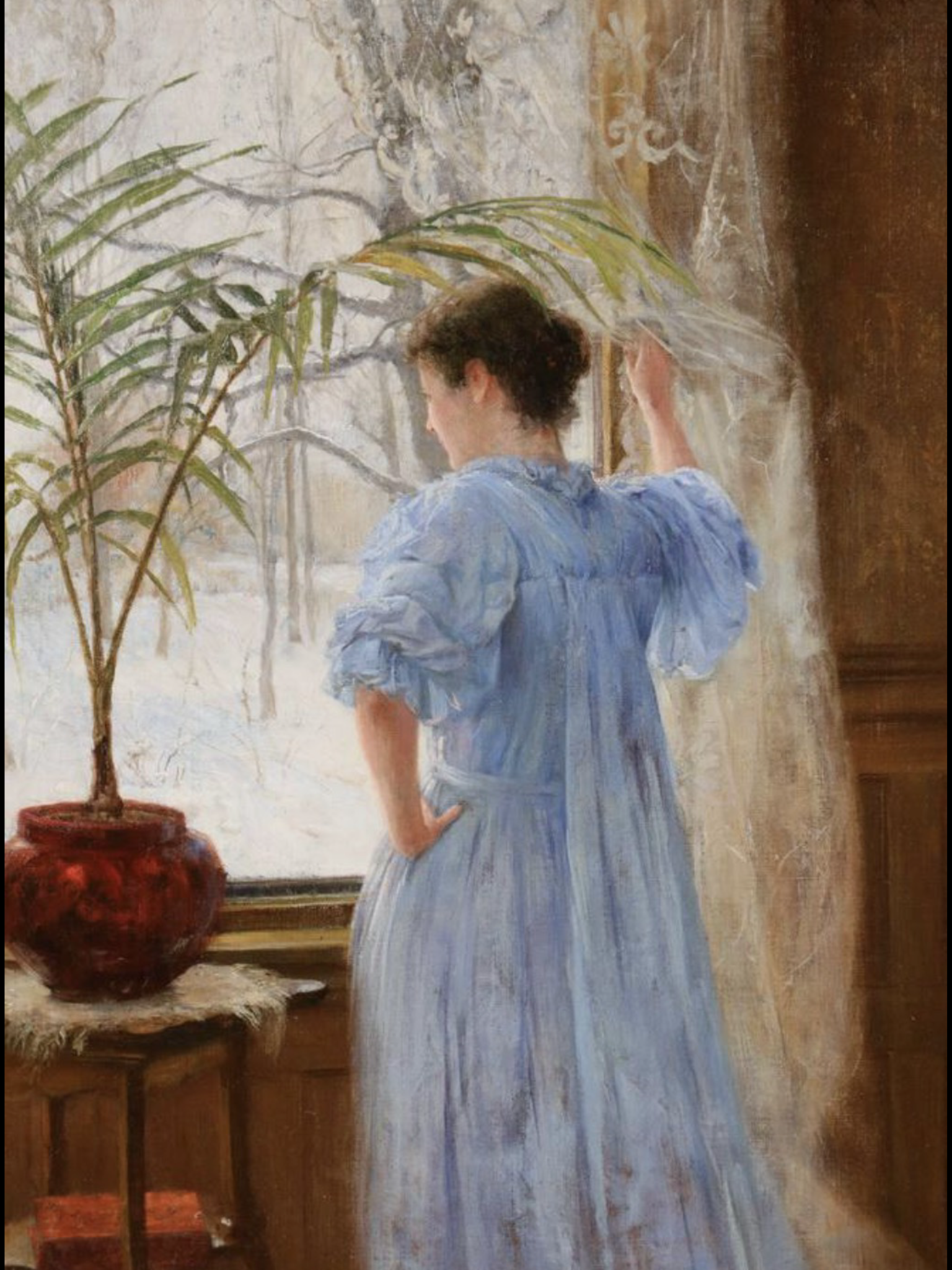
- First Snow (c. 1895)
  First Snow (c. 1895, private collection)
- Portrait of Alvina Roosen (c. 1900)
- Rainy Evening on Hennepin Avenue (c. 1902)
- Herbjørn Gausta (1915)
- Study Head (Minneapolis Institute of Arts)
- Violet (Minneapolis Athletic Club)
- Portrait of Dean Wulling (State University of Minnesota)
- The Carpenter's Family (collection of Mr. and Mrs. Daniel Elliot, Woodland Hills, CA)
- The Family Bible
- Salve Luna
- a portrait at the Alexandria, Minnesota public library
- portrait of Etta Chadbourn Ross at the Etta C. Ross Memorial Library Museum at Blue Earth, Minnesota
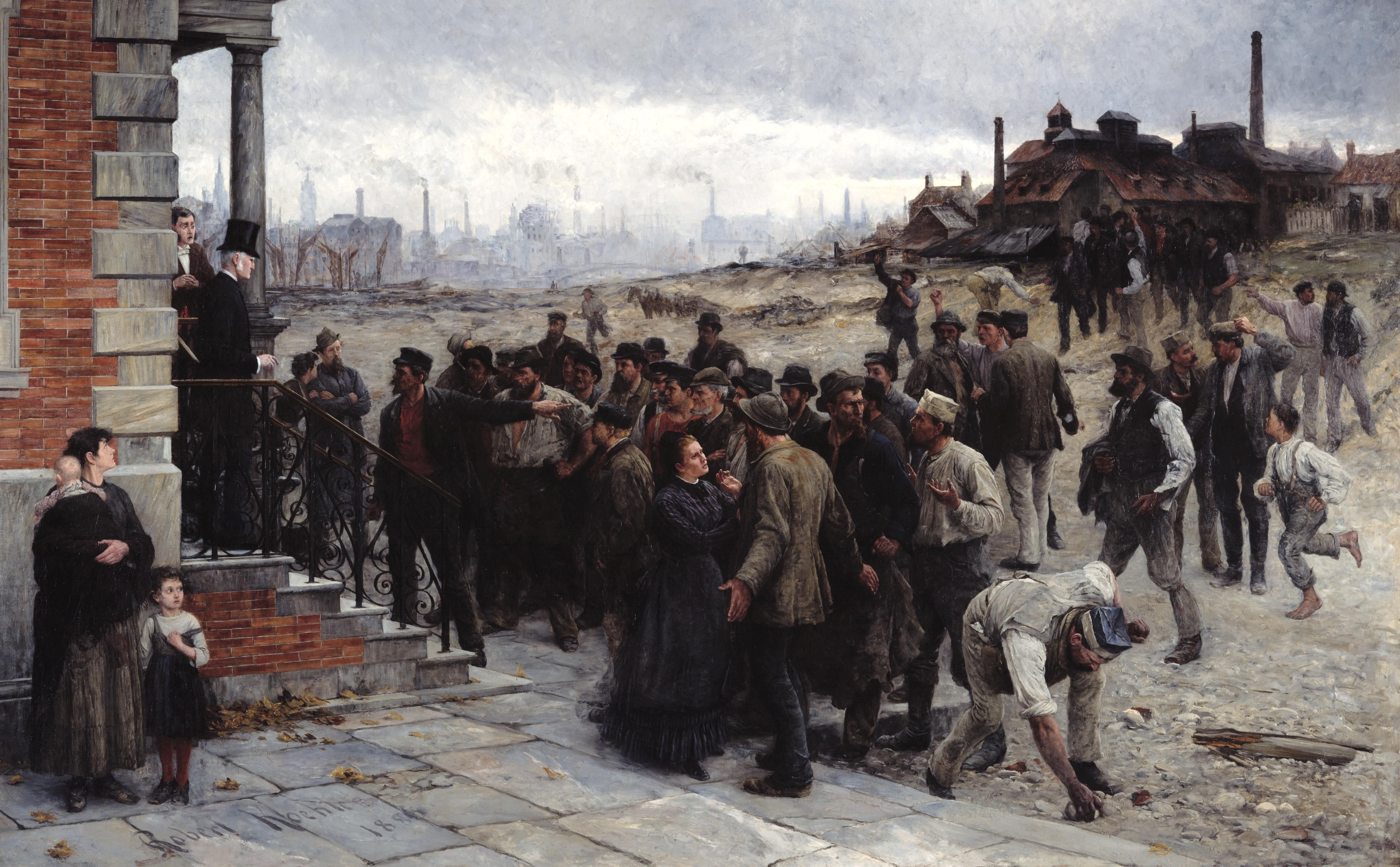
- Agitated workers face the factory owner in The Strike, painted by Koehler in 1886
