= Carl von Marr =

German painter

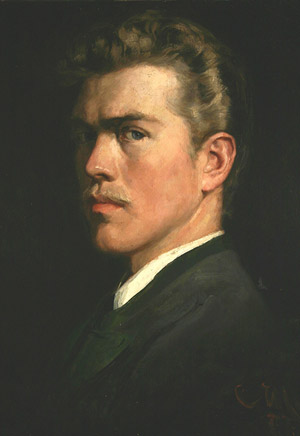
Self-portrait (1877)

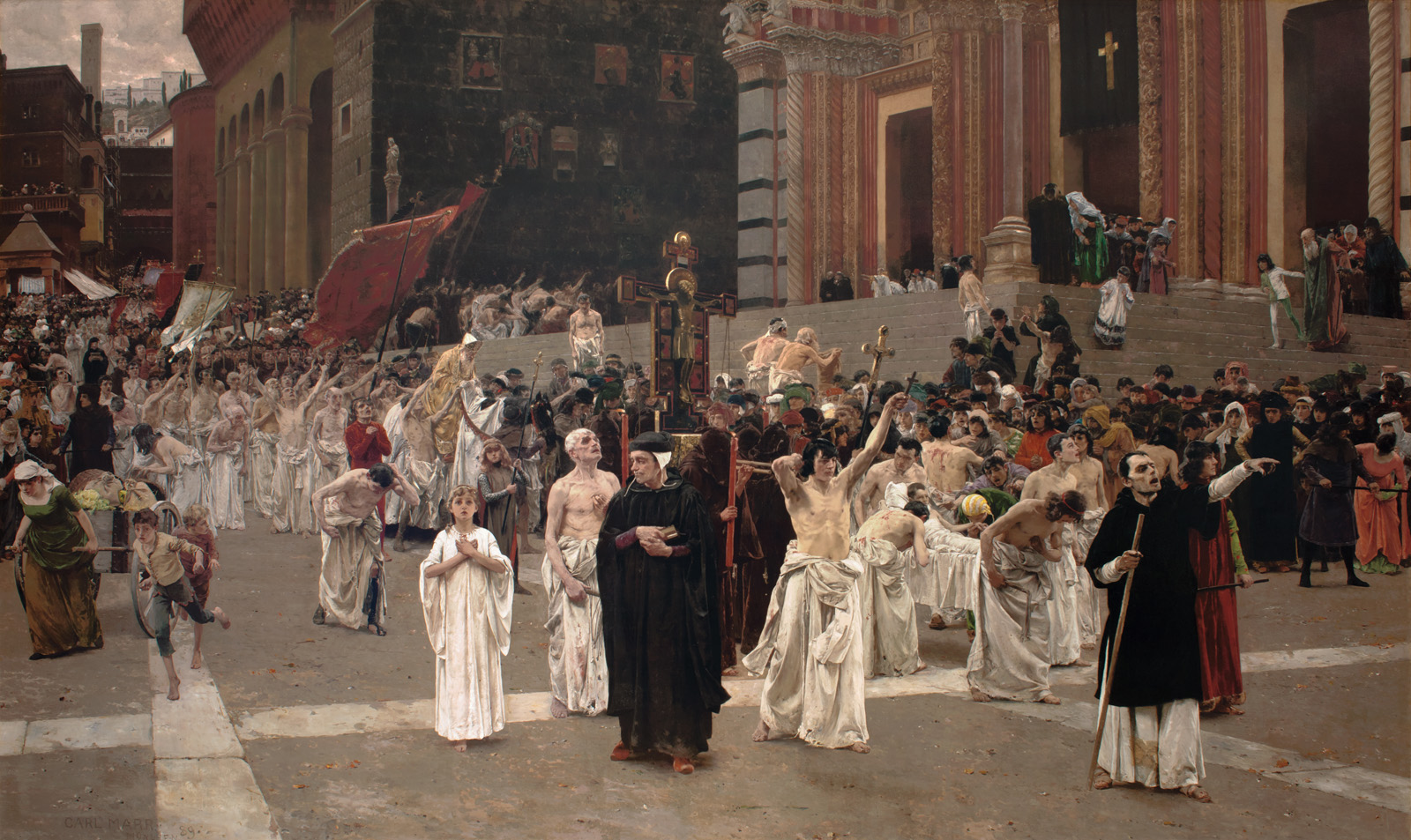
The Flagellants (1889)

Carl von Marr (February 14, 1858 – July 10, 1936) was an American-born German painter whose work encompassed religious and mythological subjects, genre, and portraits. He was also a professor of art in Munich.

== Biography ==
He was born in Milwaukee, Wisconsin. He was a pupil of Henry Vianden in Milwaukee, of Martin Schauß in Weimar, of Karl Gussow in Berlin, and subsequently of Otto Seitz at the Academy of Fine Arts Munich.

His first work, Ahasuerus, the Wandering Jew, received a medal in Munich. One of his pictures, Episode of 1813, was (as of 1911) in the Royal Hanover Gallery. His Germany in 1906 received a gold medal in Munich, and was (as of 1911) in the Prussian Royal Academy at Königsberg. A large canvas, The Flagellants, painted in 1889, is now in the collection of the Museum of Wisconsin Art, in West Bend, Wisconsin, on permanent loan from the City of Milwaukee. It received a gold medal at the Munich Exposition in 1889, a gold medal at the International Exhibition, Berlin in 1890 and a gold medal at the Columbian Exposition, Chicago World's Fair in 1893. Another canvas, Summer Afternoon, originally from the Phoebe Hearst collection, in 1911 in the permanent collection of the University of California, Berkeley, received a gold medal in Berlin, in 1892.

Marr became a professor at the Academy of Fine Arts in Munich in 1893, and in 1895 a member of the Berlin Academy of Arts. In 1916 Marr married Elsie Fellerer Messerschmitt, the widow of the painter Pius Ferdinand Messerschmitt. They had two daughters together. In 1917, Marr was appointed a privy councilor to the Bavarian government. He was forced to flee to Switzerland during the Bavarian Council Republic, which put a price on his head because of this political connection. In 1919, Marr became the director of the Royal Academy in Munich, where he continued to work until his retirement in 1923. He was diagnosed with cancer in 1934. Marr died on 10 July 1936 and is buried at the Solln Cemetery in Munich.
