= Walter Firle =

German painter

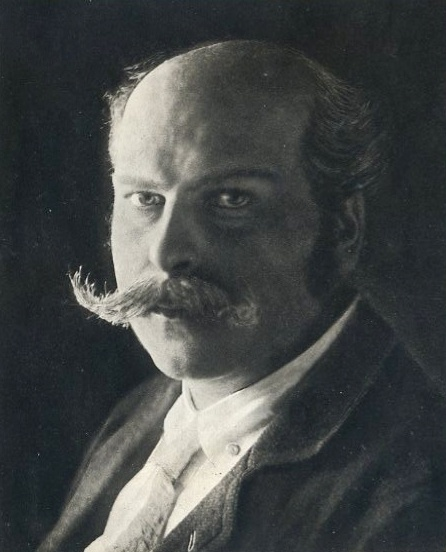
- Born: August 22, 1859; Breslau, Kingdom of Prussia
- Died: November 20, 1929 (aged 70); Munich, Bavaria, Germany

Walter Firle or Walther Firle (August 22, 1859 – November 20, 1929) was a German portrait and genre painter.

He was born in Breslau (now Wrocław) and died in Munich, where much of his work remains in public collections. Perhaps his most notable work is the portrait of King Ludwig III that was used for several postal stamp designs in the state of Bavaria.

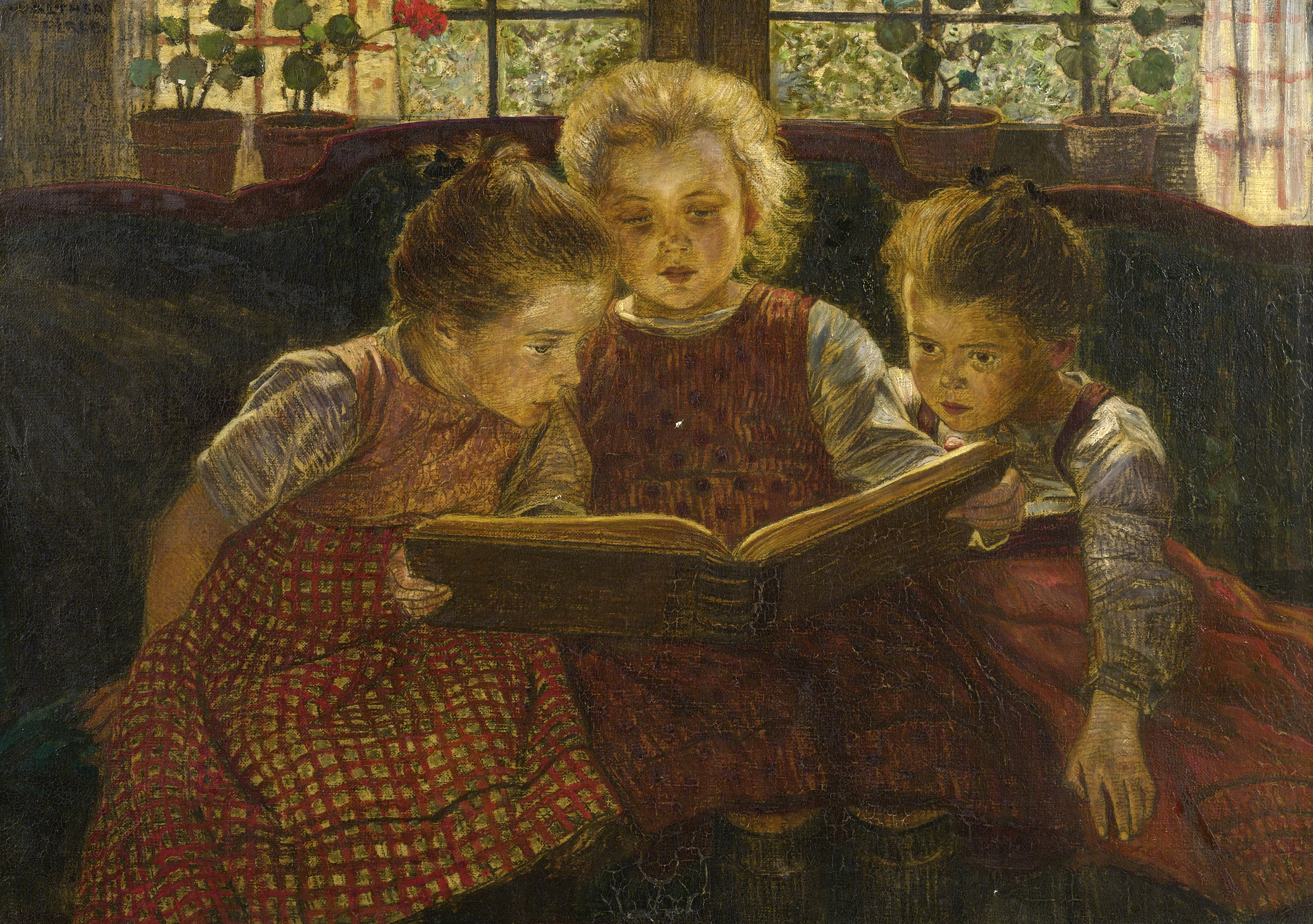
The Fairy Tale

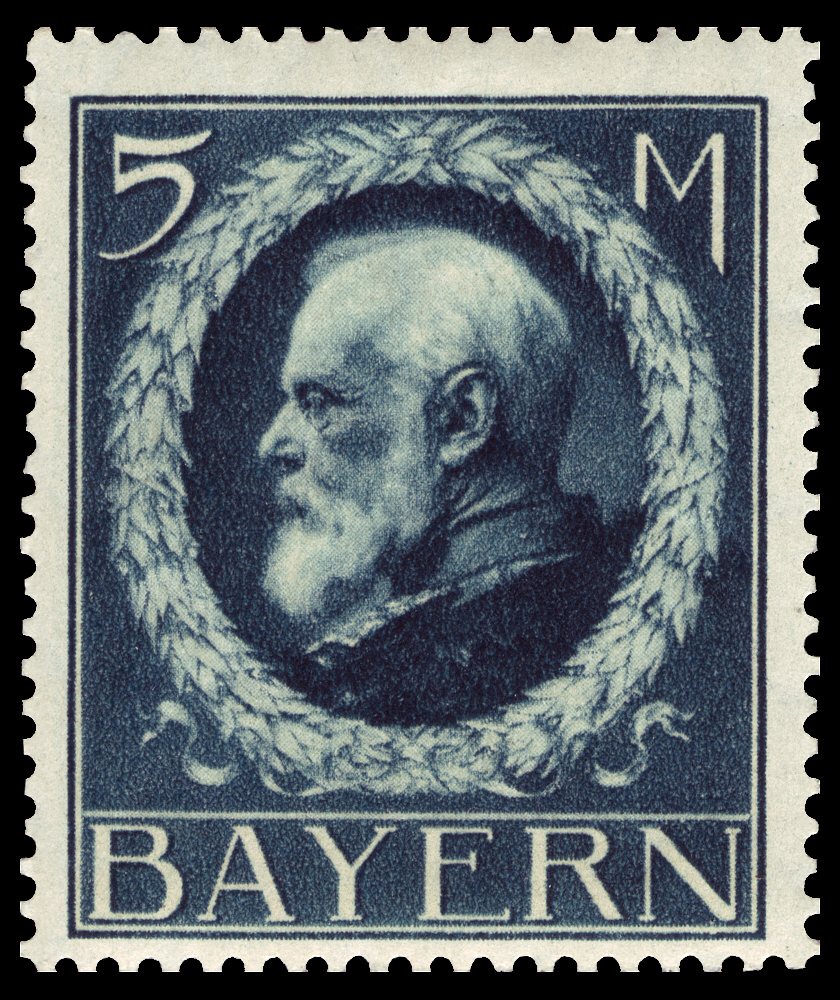
Bavarian stamp with portrait of King Ludwig III by Walter Firle (1915)
