= Global Animal Partnership =

The Global Animal Partnership (GAP) is a nonprofit which seeks to promote the welfare of farmed animals by rating the welfare standards of various farmed animal products.

== History ==
GAP was founded in 2008 with assistance from Whole Foods Market. According to GAP's website, Whole Foods had piloted its own animal welfare rating program, but Whole Foods CEO John Mackey felt that an independent organization would be more effective. In different phases, the Global Animal Partnership launched farm standards for broiler chickens, pigs, beef cattle, and turkeys. The organization intends to launch additional welfare standards for other species as it grows.

== 5-Step Animal Welfare Rating Program ==
=== Standards ===
==== Beef cattle ====
- Step 1: There is at least 50% vegetative cover on pasture/range, and dehorning is prohibited.
- Step 2: Objects for grooming and scratching, as well as shade for all animals to rest together at the same time are provided.
- Step 3: There is no Step 3 for cattle.
- Step 4: Cattle are removed from pasture/range only when weather conditions put them at risk.
- Step 5: There is at least 75% vegetative cover on pasture/range. All physical alterations, including castration, is prohibited.
- Step 5+: Calves are weaned naturally, and transportation is prohibited.

==== Broiler chickens ====
- Step 1: Cages are prohibited and all physical alterations, including beak trimming, are prohibited.
- Step 2: Habitats are enriched to encourage foraging behavior, and cover or blinds are provided.
- Step 3: Chickens have continuous outdoor access during daylight hours.
- Step 4: Chickens have continuous access to foraging areas or pasture, including indoor foraging areas during inclement weather.
- Step 5: Season housing is prohibited. Perches for all birds to perch at the same time are provided.
- Step 5+: Chickens are killed on-farm or locally.

==== Pigs ====
- Step 1: Cages, stalls, and crates are prohibited, as is tail docking. There is bedding in all housing.
- Step 2: Enrichments to encourage foraging behavior are provided. The minimum weaning age is 35 days.
- Step 3: Pigs have continuous outdoor access during daylight hours.
- Step 4: Pigs have continuous access to foraging areas or pasture, and unrestricted access to wallows on pasture.
- Step 5: Litters of piglets stay. All physical alterations, including castration, are prohibited.
- Step 5+: Transportation is prohibited.

==== Turkeys ====
- Step 1: Cages, toe-clipping, and dubbing are prohibited.
- Step 2: Enrichments to encourage foraging behavior are provided. Toenail conditioning is prohibited.
- Step 3: Turkeys have continuous access to the outdoors during daylight hours.
- Step 4: Turkeys have continuous access to foraging areas or pasture with at least 50% vegetation or cover. Beak trimming is prohibited.
- Step 5: Seasonal housing is prohibited. Perches for all birds to perch at the same time are provided.
- Step 5+: Turkeys are killed on-farm or locally.

=== Certification process ===
To get 5-Step Certified, a farm submits an application to a third-party accreditor. The accreditor audits the farm and decides on the accreditation accordingly, and the Global Animal Partnership provides appropriate labeling and marketing.

== Farm coverage ==
GAP's standards cover approximately 290 million farmed animals. According to the Open Philanthropy Project, the GAP achieves this scale largely through contracts with large producers including Tyson Foods, Perdue Farms, and Whole Foods. Whole Foods only carries GAP-certified chicken, cow, pig, and turkey.

A significant fraction of these 290 million animals are kept in Step 2 facilities, which according to Open Philanthropy whose welfare conditions are only a slight improvement over those of typical factory farms.

== Retailers ==
In addition to Whole Foods, GAP-certified animal products are sold by Tender & True Pet Nutrition, Boulder Natural Meats and Creminelli Fine Meats.

== Funding and support ==
Whole Foods used to donate $200,000 a year to GAP, but now their support is in the form of labeling fees and the provision of two full-time staff.

In 2015, The Humane Society of the United States (HSUS) donated $25,000 to GAP.

In 2016, Open Philanthropy awarded GAP a grant of $500,000 over two years "to allow GAP to invest in strengthening its standards and audit oversight, and developing its business model and revenue streams."

Also in 2016, GAP announced a partnership with Redlaw Sauce Company in which Redlaw will donate 5% of its profits to GAP.

== Controversy ==
GAP has been criticized by some animal activists for deceptiveness about the conditions animals live in. A 2015 undercover investigation by the activist group Direct Action Everywhere (DxE) of Whole Foods supplier Diestel Turkey Ranch facility, produced video footage of turkeys in poor conditions, including those with matted feathers, swollen body parts, and carcasses decomposing among live birds. Diestel Turkey Ranch's facilities had received Step 3 and Step 5+ ratings from the Global Animal Partnership. Spokespeople for Whole Foods and Diestel Farms claimed the footage was misleading.

In 2015 People for the Ethical Treatment of Animals (PETA) filed a lawsuit against Whole Foods on the grounds that its labeling of animal products with the 5-Step rating program deceived customers. According to PETA's complaint, "The entire audit process for Whole Foods' animal welfare standards is a sham because it occurs infrequently and violations of the standards do not cause loss of certification...Standards that are not actually enforced create a false impression of ensuring a more humanely treated, higher quality animal product — when in fact they ensure no such thing." The case was dismissed in April 2016 on the grounds that PETA had not shown that Whole Foods' alleged misrepresentations defrauded consumers. According to Judge Nathanael Cousins, "Retailers do not have a duty to disclose product information unless it relates to a consumer safety issue", and PETA had not raised any safety concerns.

In January 2016, a number of animal activist groups including DxE, PETA, Last Chance for Animals, and the Christian Vegetarian Association signed an open letter to Whole Foods condemning GAP's rating system.
