= HBN =

HBN may refer to:

== Science ==
- Haemoglobin N (HbN), a globin protein
- Hexagonal boron nitride
- Jacob Hübner (1761–1826), German entomologist

== Other uses ==
- HBN Law, a law firm in Curaçao
- Healthy Building Network, an American green building non-profit
- Heiban language, spoken in Sudan
- Hollingbourne railway station, in England
