= Richard Makin =

English vegan cookbook writer and food blogger

Richard Makin is an English vegan cookbook writer and food blogger who promotes plant-based recipes. He owns the websites School Night Vegan and All Veg Considered. Makin describes himself as an "experimental vegan food scientist".

== Career ==
Makin graduated from SOAS University of London with a linguistics degree and spent time exploring San Francisco's street food scene. Upon returning to London in 2015 he purchased a van and established his own ice cream company. His company Blu Top specialized in home-made ice cream cookie sandwiches. His company used unhomogenised whole milk from The Estate Dairy. It took Makin 400 attempts to bake the perfect cookie.

Makin created School Night Vegan in 2018 to share vegan recipes. In 2019 he joined Wicked Kitchen. In 2023, he authored his first cookbook Anything You Can Cook, I Can Cook Vegan. It was rated by The Independent as one of the "14 best vegan cookbooks" of 2024. It includes a wide range of recipes from a fry-up breakfast to macaroni and cheese. It also includes plant-based "egg" and meat substitute recipes such as seitan and tofu. A review in the Stylist commented that the book is a "reminder that vegan cooking doesn’t have to be pared back; in fact, it’s possible to create dishes that are just as exciting and delicious as their non-plant-based counterparts".

Makin has written recipes for Olive Magazine and Plant-Based News. He works for the vegan travel company The Getaway Co.

== Personal life ==
Makin is a life-long vegetarian and advocate for animal rights. In November 2017, he became vegan. He resides at Hastings with his husband.

== Selected publications ==
- Anything You Can Cook, I Can Cook Vegan (Bloomsbury Publishing, 2023)
