= Institute for Local Self-Reliance =

American non-profit organization

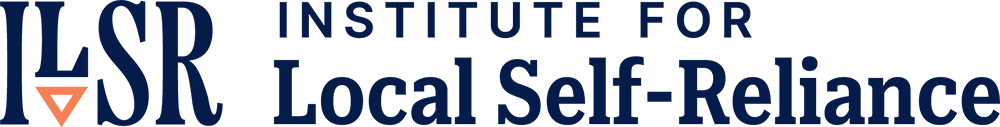
- Founded: 1974
- Type: Non-governmental organization
- Purpose: Community development, sustainability, community banking, broadband, energy, waste, composting, independent business
- Location(s): Washington, D.C. Minneapolis, Minnesota; Portland, Maine
- Region served: United States
- Method: Advocacy, research, technical assistance
- Key people: Stacy Mitchell and John Farrell, Co-Directors
- Website: ilsr.org

The Institute for Local Self-Reliance (ILSR) is a nonprofit organization and advocacy group that was founded in 1974. The organization provides technical assistance to communities about local solutions for sustainable community development in areas such as banking, broadband, energy, independent business, and waste. ILSR has three main offices, one in Washington, D.C., Portland, Maine, and Minneapolis, Minnesota.

== History ==
=== 1980s ===
In the 1980s, ILSR worked with community organizations to halt a plan for six waste incineration plants in Los Angeles. With ILSR's assistance, the Los Angeles groups then formed a coalition throughout Southern California that campaigned to have 15 additional mass burn plants cancelled between 1985 and 1988 in favor of recycling technologies.

=== 2000s ===
In October 2007, Booklist named ILSR Senior Researcher Stacy Mitchell's book Big-Box Swindle as one of the top ten business books of the year. Reminiscent of ILSR's early work on the economic impact of fast-food chains, this book details the largely negative economic and environmental impacts of big box stores and how ILSR is helping dozens of communities around the county buck this trend.

In April 2008, ILSR's Healthy Building Network (HBN) program was spun off as an independent nonprofit organization. HBN is a network of green building professionals, environmental and health activists, socially responsible investment advocates and others who promote healthier building materials as a means of improving public health and preserving the global environment.

=== 2010–present ===
In August 2019, ILSR's Brenda Platt and Neil Seldman were profiled in Biocycle Magazine about their history of work on zero waste and community-scaled composting.

In February 2020, ILSR Co-director Stacy Mitchell appeared in PBS Frontline's documentary, Amazon: The Rise and Reign of Jeff Bezos.

In April 2020, ILSR Co-director Stacy Mitchell was profiled in the New York Times by David Streitfeld. The article primarily focuses on her work and efforts to oppose Amazon's growing monopoly power.

In 2021, Politico called the organization "one of the most prominent critics of the tech industry in Washington."
