= Derek Sarno =

American plant-based chef and cookbook writer

- Occupations: Chef; author
- Family: Chad Sarno (brother) Jake Sarno (son)
- Website: wickedkitchen.com

Derek Sarno is an American plant-based chef, cookbook writer and co-founder of the website Wicked Kitchen.

== Biography ==
Sarno is co-founder of Wicked Kitchen, a plant-based website that he co-founded with his brother Chad. Sarno was Director of Plant Based Innovation at Tesco. In 2023, he stepped down as Director.

He is also co-founding a plant-based seafood company Good Catch Foods, and he was previously Senior Global Executive Chef of Recipe and Product Development at Whole Foods Market. He participated in the 2016 Seed Food and Wine Fest in Miami, including using mushrooms to "taste, and even feel, like your favorite meaty meals" according to Men's Journal.

In his role at Tesco, where vegetarian and vegan product sales increased 25% from 2016 to 2017, Sarno helped to develop their plant-based food options, such as by doubling the vegetarian and vegan entreés of their 2017 Christmas product line.

He argues that "the approach that will win" for plant-based food is increasing its availability and convenience, especially in the UK, which he believes lags behind the US. He also wants less emphasis on the "vegan" label, given vegans make up a small minority of the population, and instead he wants focus on "food that's good for everyone." He and his brother use their blog to advocate for an "80% healthy, 20% wicked" diet as an accessible, durable way to stay healthy.

In 2023, Tasting Table named Sarno as one of the "21 Plant-Based Chefs You Need To Know," and VegNews listed him as one of the "37 Creative Chefs Crafting the Future of Vegan Food."

== Book ==
VegNews listed Wicked Healthy as one of the "Top 100 Vegan Cookbooks of All Time" in 2024.

- Sarno, Chad, Sarno, Derek; The Wicked Healthy Cookbook (Grand Central, 2018) ISBN 978-1-4555-7028-7
- The Whole Foods Cookbook: 120 Delicious and Healthy Plant-Centered Recipes (with Alona Pulse MD, Matthew Lederman MD, John Mackey (businessman) and Chad Sarno, Grand Central/Hachette, 2018)
