= Creminelli Fine Meats =

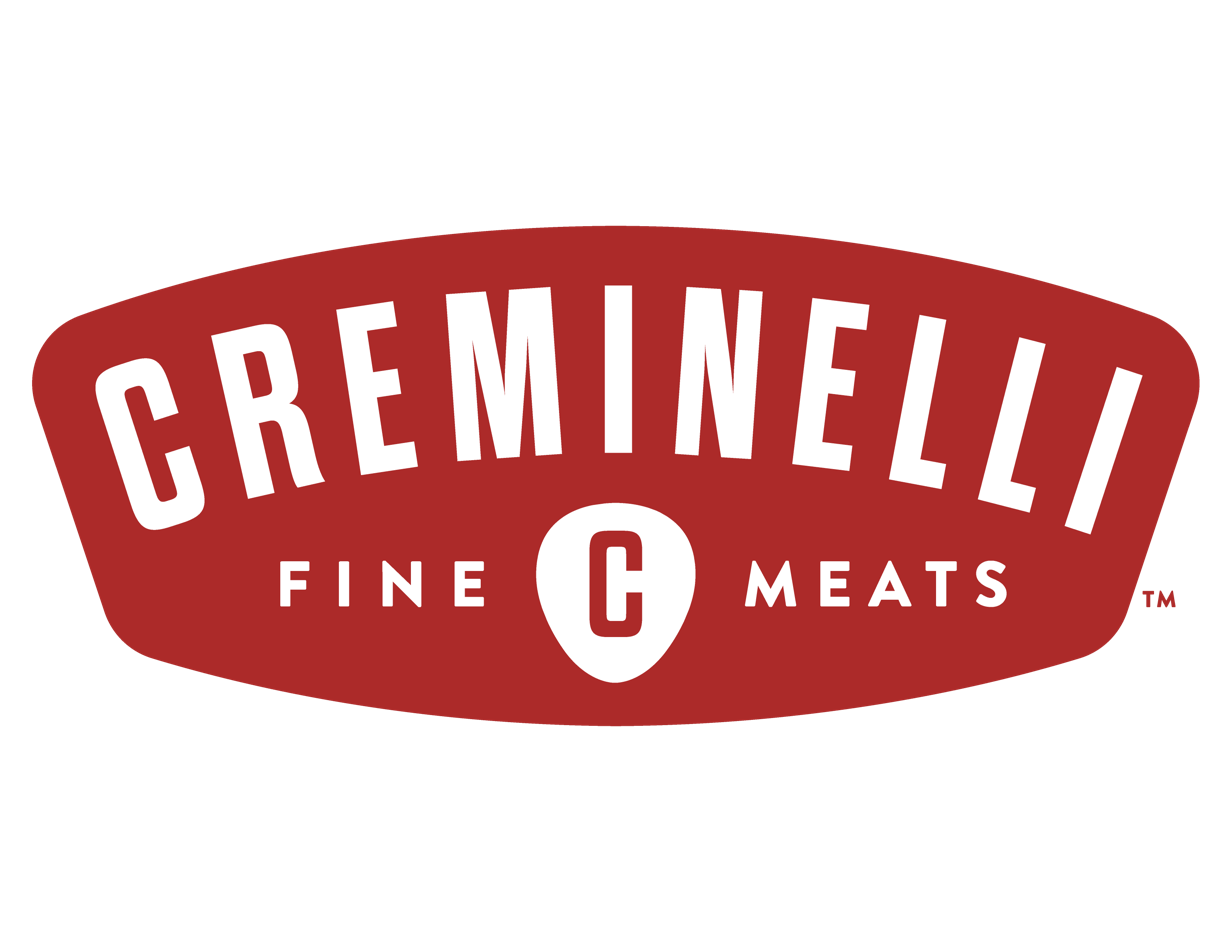
- Company type: Private
- Industry: Food
- Founded: 2007
- Founders: Cristiano Creminelli, Chris Bowler, Jared Lynch
- Headquarters: Salt Lake City, Utah
- Products: Artisan meats
- Website: www.creminelli.com

Creminelli Fine Meats is an American/Italian producer and seller of artisan meats. Cristiano Creminelli launched the Salt Lake City-based company in 2007 with business partners Chris Bowler and Jared Lynch. Creminelli has been recognized with various Sofi Awards and was named to Bon Appétit's "Tastemaker list" in 2012.

== History ==
Creminelli Fine Meats was founded in 2007 by Cristiano Creminelli, Chris Bowler, and Jared Lynch. The Creminelli family has been in artisan meat and cheese for multiple generations, first as farm-steading producers and then as owners of Salumificio di Vigliano. Cristiano Creminelli's maternal grandfather produced meat products, as well as served as the personal chef for General Pietro Badoglio, the Italian general who took over the government briefly after Benito Mussolini was deposed. Cristiano's father took over Salumifico di Vigliano, which would become the family business in the 1970s. Cristiano served as his father's apprentice in his teens. He was put in charge of production in 1990 and was managing the all aspects of the business by 1996. Chris Bowler was working as an official liaison for the US Olympic Committee in Italy for the 2006 Torino Winter Olympics when he met Creminelli, who at the time was in the process of taking over the family business and looking to expand outside of his hometown of Biella, Italy. Bowler and Creminelli decided to establish Creminelli Fine Meats with Lynch in Salt Lake City. After moving to the US, the company was initially operating out of the basement of Tony Caputo's Gourmet Food Market & Deli in downtown Salt Lake City. It relocated several times before moving into a 75,000-square-foot processing facility. By 2015, the company was generating $29.6 million in revenue.

== Operations ==
The company operates out of Salt Lake City because the dry climate in Utah is similar to that of the Northern Italy regions where the Creminelli family has been producing cured meats and cheeses for many generations. Creminelli specializes in making old-world-style salumi from heritage pigs. The company uses the family's traditional Italian meat curing recipes and techniques to produce its all-natural meats such as prosciutto, coppa, mortadella, bresaola, and various handcrafted salamis. Its products are distributed through national retailers such as Whole Foods Market and Harmons, as well as over 8,000 Starbucks across North America. Creminelli Fine Meats are also served in restaurants across the country and sold online.

== Awards ==
After finishing as a silver finalist at the Sofi Awards for four consecutive years, Creminelli won the Sofi Award in the "meat, pate or seafood" category for its new smoky, spicy Campania salami in 2013.
