= Whole Foods Parking Lot =

Single by Fog and Smog
- Released: June 12, 2011
- Genre: Rap
- Length: 3:54
- Songwriter: David Wittman (DJDave)

Music video
- "Whole Foods Parking Lot" on YouTube

"Whole Foods Parking Lot" is a 2011 rap song by Fog and Smog. The song humorously describes various interactions occurring in and around a Whole Foods Market. The music video for the song went viral.

== Background ==
The video was produced by David Wittman, a commercial songwriter. Under the stage name DJDave, Wittman is leader of the Bay Area and Los Angeles, California-based creative collective, Fog and Smog. Wittman says he wrote the song in 20 minutes, and that it contains musical references to songs by Snoop Dogg.

The song features a series of self-parodying vignettes spoofing the performer's annoyance with other people in and around a Whole Foods store set in West Los Angeles, including kombucha, overspending, aggressive parking, Prius automobiles, rude mobile phone users, shoppers wearing yoga pants, the Master Cleanse diet, and Humboldt Fog cheese. The video was shot at real Whole Foods store locations in Santa Monica, California and Venice, California.

== Reception ==
Within several days of release the video had more than 500,000 YouTube views. Television presenter Ryan Seacrest tweeted the link to his followers, and Whole Foods management sought to distribute the video, despite its mild criticism of the establishment. Wittman says he did not intend to criticize Whole Foods, but to show "him laughing at himself and people like him who find themselves getting stressed trying to find a parking space at Whole Foods or dealing with irritating fellow shoppers." Wittman says the song "speaks to how we consume things these days." He recounts the inspiration came while shopping with the list shown in the video, intending to make dinner for his fiancée and nearly honking at someone in the parking lot. He thought, "what am I doing? This is crazy!"

"It's Getting Real in the Whole Foods Parking Lot" has spawned several responses from artists and musicians. The artist Delia Brown created a rap video response entitled "Revenge of the Black Prius". The video is available on iTunes and Amazon, where the artist is listed as Del-Nel.

Rapper Lae (LaeCharles Lawrence Jr.) has created "Whole Foods Parking Lot (Berkeley Remix)".

DJDave and Lae created a joint video (through FogandSmog productions) in which DJDave compliments Lae on his Berkeley Remix and Lae accuses DJDave of not being Berkeley enough.
