= Stacy Mitchell =

American activist and author

Stacy Mitchell is an American activist and author. She is co-director of the Institute for Local Self-Reliance.

== Biography ==
Mitchell grew up in Portland, Maine. She graduated with a B.A. in history from Macalester College.

She is chair of the American Independent Business Alliance.

In 1997, Mitchell became a research assistant at the Institute for Local Self-Reliance with headquarters in Minneapolis. She later became the co-executive director of the Institute and runs a small regional office of the institute in Portland.

In 2016, Mitchell co-authored Amazon’s Stranglehold.

On May 29, 2023, an editorial by Mitchell was published in the New York Times.

In her book big box swindle, Mitchell describes the "Geoffrey Loophole", a tax loophole used by retailers that have locations in different states to avoid paying corporate income taxes. It is named after Geoffrey the Giraffe, the mascot for Toys R Us.

== Awards and honors ==
Big-Box Swindle was named a best business book of 2007 by the American Library Association.

In 2014, Mitchell was awarded the Beacon Award by Portland Buy Local for her "leadership and innovation in developing Portland's independent and local economy.”

== Books ==
- Big-Box Swindle: The True Cost of Mega-Retailers and the Fight for America's Independent Businesses (Beacon Press, 2006)
- Hometown Advantage: How to Defend Your Main Street Against Chain Stores and Why it Matters (Institute for Local Self-Reliance, 2000)
