= John Mackey (businessman) =

American businessman, writer, and former CEO of Whole Foods Market

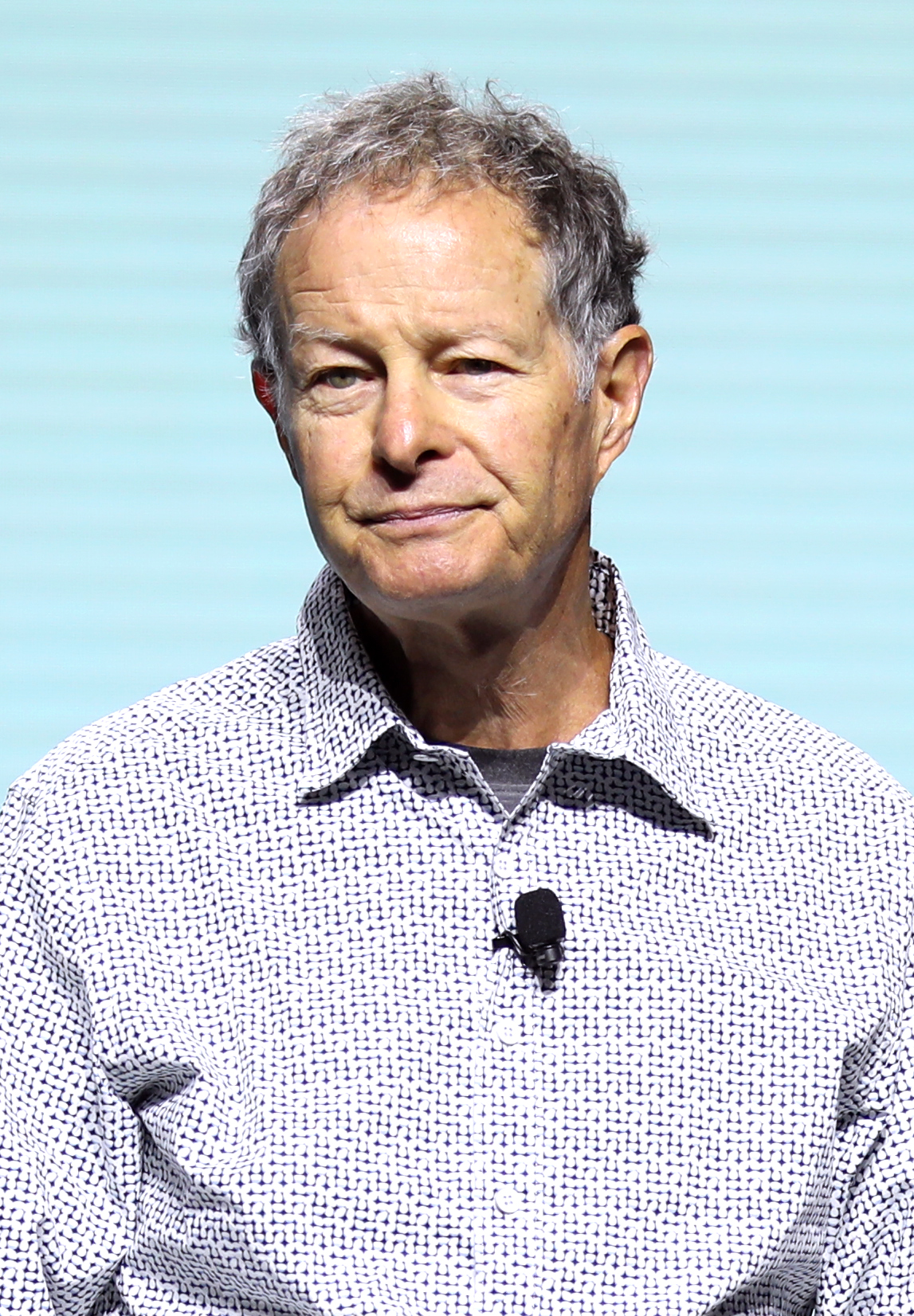
- Mackey in 2024
- Born: August 15, 1953 (age 73); Houston, Texas, U.S.
- Education: University of Texas at Austin; Trinity University
- Occupations: Businessman; author
- Known for: Cofounder and former CEO of Whole Foods Market
- Political party: Libertarian
- Spouse: Deborah Morin (m. 1991)
- Website: johnpmackey.com

John Powell Mackey (born August 15, 1953) is an American businessman and author. He is the co-founder of Whole Foods Market and was the chief executive officer of the company from its inception in 1980 until his retirement in 2022. He is currently the CEO of Love.Life, which he also co-founded.

A vocal member of the Libertarian Party, Mackey is a strong supporter of free market economics. Mackey has criticized labor unions, and describes his views as "beyond union." Named Ernst & Young entrepreneur of the year in 2003, he is a leader in the natural food movement. He has also written books on business and on plant-based diets.

== Early life and education ==
Mackey was born on August 15, 1953, in Houston, Texas, the son of Margaret Wescott (Powell) and William Sturges "Bill" Mackey, Jr. He has a younger sister and an older brother.

John Mackey's father Bill was a professor of accounting, CEO of LifeMark, a health-care company, and investor of Whole Foods Market, before he died in 2004. In the abstract to his book Conscious Capitalism, Mackey thanks his father for teaching him valuable life lessons.

Mackey's mother Margaret died in 1987 when he was 34. John and Margaret had a strained relationship, partly due to her desire for a different future regarding her son. Margaret felt that such a “fine mind” should devote its time doing something more productive than retailing. John did not agree, but in later years he regretted that he did not make it more clear that he loved her.

Mackey was a student of philosophy and religion at the University of Texas at Austin and Trinity University in the 1970s, and worked at a vegetarian co-op. Mackey spent almost six years at university without achieving a degree. Mackey credits his generalist approach to learning as the main reason he was able to be successful in business.

Mackey became a vegetarian in 1976 and an ethical vegan in 2003. In the late 2000s, he turned towards a plant-based diet after reading works by T. Colin Campbell and Caldwell Esselstyn.

== Career ==
Mackey co-founded his first health food store, SaferWay, with his girlfriend Renee Lawson (Hardy) in Austin in 1978. They met while living in a vegetarian housing co-op.

They borrowed $10,000 and raised $35,000 more to start SaferWay. At the time, Austin had several small health food stores. The two ran the market on the first floor, a health food restaurant on the second, and, for a short time, lived in the third story of their building. In two years, they merged SaferWay with Clarksville Natural Grocery run by Mark Skiles and Craig Weller and renamed the business Whole Foods Market. All four (Mackey, Hardy-Lawson, Skiles and Weller) are considered co-founders of the business.

=== Animal welfare ===
Whole Foods was the first grocery chain to set standards for humane animal treatment. Mackey was influenced by animal rights activist, Lauren Ornelas, who criticized Whole Foods' animal standards regarding ducks at a shareholder meeting in 2003. Mackey gave Ornelas his email address and they corresponded on the issue. He studied issues related to factory farming and decided to switch to a primarily vegan diet that included only eggs from his own chickens. Since 2006, he has followed an entirely plant-based diet. He advocates tougher animal standards.

Despite Whole Foods' welfare standards, Mackey has been criticized by abolitionist vegans such as Gary L. Francione, who believes the Whole Foods company policies betray the animal rights position. Mackey started a non-profit foundation, the Animal Compassion Foundation, to address making animal welfare more economically viable. The Animal Compassion Foundation folded in 2008 with the formation of the Global Animal Partnership, a nonprofit organization that is independent of Whole Foods Market. Mackey is on the board of directors of Global Animal Partnership. Additionally, he is a board member of Farm Forward, a 501(c)(3) nonprofit organization that implements innovative strategies to promote conscientious food choices, reduce farmed animal suffering, and advance sustainable agriculture, and he has been a member of the board of directors for the Humane Society of the United States since 2009.

=== Letter to employees ===
In 2006, Mackey announced he was reducing his salary to $1 a year, would donate his stock portfolio to charity, and set up a $100,000 emergency fund for staff facing personal problems. He wrote: "I am now 53 years old and I have reached a place in my life at which I no longer want to work for money, but simply for the joy of the work itself and to better answer the call to service that I feel so clearly in my own heart."

He has instituted caps on executive pay at the company.

=== Yahoo! Finance postings ===
In July 2007, The Wall Street Journal revealed that Mackey was, for at least seven years, using the pseudonym "Rahodeb" (an anagram of his wife's name, Deborah) to post to Yahoo Finance forums. He referred to himself in the third person and criticized rival supermarket chain Wild Oats Markets. The Federal Trade Commission approved a complaint challenging Whole Foods Market's approximately $670 million acquisition of its chief rival, Wild Oats Markets, Inc. It authorized the FTC staff to seek a temporary restraining order and preliminary injunction in federal district court to halt the deal, pending an administrative trial on the merits. After an extensive regulatory battle with the FTC, a federal appeals court consented to the deal. Whole Foods officially completed its buyout of Wild Oats in August 2007.

In May 2008, after an SEC investigation cleared him, Mackey started blogging again. In a 2,037 word post, he wrote about why he began blogging in the first place and how his upbringing drove him to defend himself and Whole Foods. He admitted he made a mistake in judgment, but not in ethics.

=== Resignation as chairman ===
In December 2009, Mackey resigned as chairman of the board of Whole Foods, a position he held since 1978. On his blog, he said, "John Elstrott will now take the title of Chairman of the Board, which will accurately reflect the authority and the responsibilities that he has had for many years." Mackey remains a member of the board of directors.

=== Retirement from Whole Foods Market ===
In September 2022, Mackey stepped down as CEO of the company, which he had been since its inception in 1980. He was succeeded by Jason Buechel, who was executive vice president and chief information officer (CIO) between 2013 and 2019, followed by a tenure as chief operating officer (COO) from 2019.

=== Love.Life ===
Following Mackey's retirement from Whole Foods in 2022, he cofounded a health and wellness company along with other Whole Foods veterans. Incorporated in 2020 as Healthy America LLC, and doing business as Love.Life, the company opened its flagship medical center focusing on preventive care in El Segundo, California, in 2024.

== Political views ==
=== Libertarianism ===
In a debate in the October 2005 issue of Reason magazine among Mackey, economist Milton Friedman, and entrepreneur T. J. Rodgers, Mackey said that he is a free-market libertarian. He said that he used to be a democratic socialist in college. As a beginning businessman, he was challenged by workers for not paying adequate wages and by customers for overcharging, during a time when he was having difficulty breaking even. He began to take a more capitalistic worldview, and discovered the works of Ludwig von Mises, Friedrich Hayek, and Milton Friedman. Mackey is an admirer of some of Ayn Rand's novels.

Mackey co-founded the organization Freedom Lights Our World (FLOW) to combine his commitments to "economic and political freedom as well as personal growth, social responsibility, and environmental stewardship." He supports such changes as green tax shifts, environmental trusts, world legal systems to allow the poor to create legal businesses, and a citizen's dividend to help the poor in the developed world. The name and focus of FLOW have since become Conscious Capitalism, Inc., which was initially created as a program of FLOW and evolved to the point at which it became the organization's principal focus. In 2010 the name of the organization was formally changed. The Conscious Capitalism Institute was chartered in 2009. In 2010 the original FLOW group merged with the institute group to become one unified organization. In 2013, Mackey was interviewed on Harvard Business Review's Ideacast podcast about his views on conscious business. Mackey said, "If you want to be competitive in the long term, your business needs to have discovered its higher purpose and it needs to adopt a stakeholder philosophy". He eschewed the conventional thinking that "business has to be sort of ruthless and heartless to be successful".

=== Healthcare reform ===
Mackey opposed the public health insurance option that ultimately did not become part of the Patient Protection and Affordable Care Act. Mackey asserted that a better plan would be allowing consumers to purchase health insurance across state lines and use a combination of health savings accounts and catastrophic insurance, as Whole Foods does. Mackey's statement that Americans do not have an intrinsic right to healthcare led to calls for a boycott of Whole Foods Market from the Progressive Review and from numerous groups on Facebook. Alternatively, Tea Party movement advocates organized a number of buycotts in support of Mackey's suggestions.

In August 2009, Mackey wrote the editorial in the Wall Street Journal expressing his viewpoints on universal healthcare in the United States. "While we clearly need health-care reform, the last thing our country needs is a massive new health-care entitlement that will create hundreds of billions of dollars of new unfunded deficits and move us much closer to a government takeover of our health-care system," he wrote. He continued: "Many promoters of health-care reform believe that people have an intrinsic ethical right to health care – to equal access to doctors, medicines and hospitals. While all of us empathize with those who are sick, how can we say that all people have more of an intrinsic right to health care than they have to food or shelter?"

In an NPR interview in 2013, Mackey compared the Obama administration's healthcare law to "fascism" instead of socialism, stating, "[t]echnically speaking, it's more like fascism. Socialism is where the government owns the means of production. In fascism, the government doesn't own the means of production, but they do control it – and that's what's happening with our health care programs and these reforms." The day following the interview, Mackey wrote that he regretted having made the remark, stating that he "made a poor word choice to describe [the U.S.] healthcare system." Instead, he called it "government-controlled health care".

=== Unions ===
Mackey is known for his strong anti-union views, having once compared unions to herpes in that "it won't kill you, but it's very unpleasant and will make a lot of people not want to be your lover." Whole Foods Market, along with Costco and Starbucks, teamed up in 2008 to create an alternative to the Employee Free Choice Act. The three companies invited other corporations, unions and public interest groups to join them, proposing instead that unions be given more access to meet with workers, stricter penalties for labor violations and a guaranteed right to request secret ballots in all circumstances.

Mackey commented in 2005:

It's illegal in the United States for there to be company unions – special unions which are formed and controlled by the employees and managers of the company to represent their interests and collectively bargain on their behalf. These type of unions are legal in many countries such as Japan, but are illegal in the United States. Instead the law requires that all unions be outside unions. I believe this law should be repealed and that company unions should be as legal as any other kind of voluntary association.

=== Environment ===
Mackey does not consider himself to be a skeptic of scientific opinion on climate change. Nevertheless, he rejects the scientific evidence for dangerous anthropogenic global warming, believing instead that "climate change is perfectly natural and not necessarily bad."

In a 2010 discussion of books on his reading stack with journalist Nick Paumgarten, Mackey explained his views on human-caused climate change were similar to those of Australian geologist and author Ian Plimer:

...Mackey told me that he agrees with the book [ Heaven and Earth ]'s assertion that, as he put it, "no scientific consensus exists" regarding the causes of climate change; he added, with a candor you could call bold or reckless, that it would be a pity to allow "hysteria about global warming" to cause us "to raise taxes and increase regulation, and in turn lower our standard of living and lead to an increase in poverty."

== Personal life ==
Despite the fact that Mackey's company Whole Foods had a market value of $11.7 billion in 2011, he was known for his frugality. In this time, he drove a five-year-old Honda Civic, and to this day is known for using low-cost hotels and always flying commercial. For an interview with Barron's magazine, he wore khaki shorts and a checked shirt. Much in line with the ethos of Whole Foods, Mackey doesn't eat frozen or processed meals, and is a practitioner of an organic and plant-based diet.

=== Religion ===
During his twenties, Mackey experimented with different religions and philosophies, and it was rumored for a long time that he was a Buddhist. Mackey now describes himself as a Perennialist.

=== Family ===
Mackey had a longtime relationship with Mary Kay Hagen.

Mackey married his wife, Deborah Morin, in 1991. They have no children. Both practice yoga. They spend the week in Austin and weekends at their 720-acre (291.4 ha) ranch 40 miles (64 km) west of Austin.

== Legacy and honors ==
Mackey was named the 2003 Ernst & Young Entrepreneur of the Year, and one of the top 30 CEOs in 2007 by Barron's magazine. In May 2008, he received an honorary bachelor's degree from Bentley College.

== Bibliography ==
- The Whole Story: Adventures in Love, Life, and Capitalism (BenBella Books, 2024) ISBN 978-1637745120
- Conscious Leadership: Elevating Humanity Through Business (with Steve Mcintosh and Carter Phipps, Portfolio, 2020) ISBN 978-0593083628
- The Whole Foods Cookbook: 120 Delicious and Healthy Plant-Centered Recipes (with Alona Pulse MD, Matthew Lederman MD, Derek Sarno and Chad Sarno, Grand Central/Hachette, 2018)
- The Whole Foods Diet: The Lifesaving Plan for Health and Longevity (with Alona Pulse MD and Matthew Lederman MD, Grand Central/Hachette, 2017)
- Conscious Capitalism: Liberating the Heroic Spirit of Business (with Rajendra Sisodia, Harvard Business Review Press, 2013) ISBN 978-1422144206
- Strong, Michael. Be the Solution: How Entrepreneurs and Conscious Capitalists Can Solve All the Worlds Problems (Foreword by John Mackey, John Wiley & Sons, 2009) ISBN 978-0470450031

== See also ==
- Sustainable business
