= HBN Law =

Law firm in Curaçao

HBN Law & Tax
- Headquarters: Willemstad, Curaçao
- No. of offices: 6
- No. of attorneys: > 60
- No. of employees: > 100
- Major practice areas: General Practice: Corporate Law; Commercial Law
- Key people: Board members Jan Pas (Managing Partner), Marcha Woudstra, Wendell Meriaan
- Revenue: undisclosed
- Profit per equity partner: undisclosed
- Date founded: 1938
- Company type: [Limited liability partnership]
- Website: www.hbnlawtax.com

HBN Law & Tax is the largest law and tax firm in the Caribbean part of the Kingdom of the Netherlands and is through continuation also one of its oldest law firms, having been founded in 1938.

With around 60 attorneys and tax advisors spread over its six offices in Aruba, Bonaire, Curaçao, Sint Maarten, Suriname and The Hague, HBN Law & Tax serves all Dutch law based jurisdictions, including Saba and Sint Eustatius from its offices in St. Maarten. HBN Law & Tax has been operational in the Netherlands since July 1, 2015. The firm's Amsterdam location initially served as a Dutch Caribbean Desk located at the World Trade Center, advising its clients based in the Netherlands on Dutch Caribbean legal aspects in a wide range of corporate and finance related transactions and projects. As of July 2016, HBN Law & Tax's Amsterdam office operates as a full-fledged law firm. In June 2019 the former tax advisors of KPMG Meijburg Dutch Caribbean joined HBN Law, prompting the name change to HBN Law & Tax. In August 2020 HBN Law & Tax entered into a cooperation agreement with Kenswil & Co in Suriname, which resulted in a merger one year later.

Since 2013, HBN Law & Tax has been a member of the Meritas network, a network of legal professionals which boasts a worldwide membership of approximately 7,000 attorneys.

HBN Law & Tax runs a general civil and tax practice, mainly in the areas of corporate law, commercial law, banking and insurance law, telecommunications law, construction law, real estate law, labor law, bankruptcy law, trademark law, tax advice and structuring and of course litigation in those areas. The practice of HBN Law & Tax further includes constitutional and administrative law as HBN Law & Tax frequently advises and represents the local governments in those areas.

== History ==
HBN Law & Tax was founded in 1938 when S.W. van der Meer established Law office Van der Meer in Curaçao, then in the Netherlands Antilles. At the end of the forties begin fifties of the 20th century, Van der Meer associated with Mr. Ronchi Isa. The firm changed names over the years and became Halley & Blaauw in 1991, named after its partners Lucius Halley and Rob Blaauw.

In 1993 Rob Blaauw moved the firm's office from Pietermaai to the newly restored historic Villa Belvédère in Otrobanda. Back then all law firms were concentrated around Pietermaai and Punda. Otrobanda was considered a poor area with no business opportunities.

Nelson Navarro joined the firm's partnership in 1993 and the firm renamed into Halley Blaauw & Navarro.

Eric R. de Vries joined the firm's partnership in 1997. In 2005 Eric R. de Vries became the managing partner and the firm changed its name into HBN Law. Eric R. de Vries is internationally recognized as one of the best lawyers in the Dutch Caribbean.

The firm rapidly expanded and became leading on all Dutch Caribbean islands ever since, with international arbitration and litigation practices from their offices in Amsterdam and Curaçao.

In June 2019 with the joining of several tax advisors including tax partner Wendell Meriaan, the firm changed its name to HBN Law & Tax.

HBN Law & Tax currently has circa 60 attorneys and tax advisors, 15 equity and salary partners, and a total workforce of over 100 people.
