= Whole Foods Market =

American natural supermarket chain

Whole Foods Market, Inc.
- "Kale Green" logo used since Amazon's acquisition in 2017

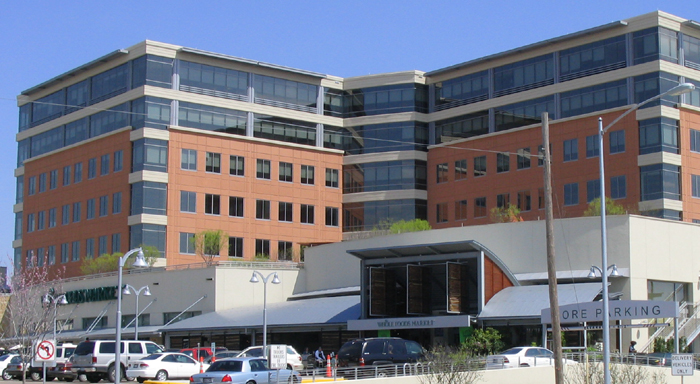
- Headquarters in Downtown Austin
- Type: Subsidiary
- Traded as: Nasdaq: WFM
- Industry: Grocery store; Health food store
- Founded: September 20, 1980; 46 years ago
- Founders: John Mackey; Renee Hardy-Lawson; Mark Skiles; Craig Weller
- Headquarters: Austin, Texas, U.S.
- Number of locations: 549 (2026)
- Areas served: United States; Canada; United Kingdom
- Key people: John B. Elstrott (chairman); Jason Buechel (CEO)
- Products: Food; pharmacy; flowers; alcohol; general merchandise
- Brands: 365
- Services: Catering; Online shopping and home delivery
- Revenue: ▲US$17 billion (2021)
- Number of employees: 105,000 (2023)
- Parent: Amazon (2017–present)
- Subsidiaries: 365 by Whole Foods Market
- Website: wholefoodsmarket.com

Whole Foods Market, Inc. (colloquially referred to as simply Whole Foods) is an American multinational supermarket chain headquartered in Austin, Texas, which generally sells whole food products free from hydrogenated fats and artificial colors, flavors, and preservatives. A USDA Certified Organic grocer in the United States, the chain is popularly known for its organic selections.

John Mackey, the last remaining co-founder of Whole Foods Market, sold the company to Amazon for $13.7 billion on August 28, 2017. As of March 4, 2019, Whole Foods has more than 500 stores in North America and six in the United Kingdom.

== History ==
=== Early years ===
In 1978, John Mackey and Renee Lawson borrowed $45,000 from family and friends to open a small vegetarian natural foods store called SaferWay in Austin, Texas (the name being a spoof of Safeway). When the two were evicted for storing food products in their apartment, they decided to live at the store. Because it was zoned for commercial use, there was no shower stall, so they bathed using a water hose attached to their dishwasher.

Two years later, Mackey and Lawson partnered with Craig Weller and Mark Skiles to merge SaferWay with the latter's Clarksville Natural Grocery, resulting in the opening of the original Whole Foods Market, which included meat products. At 10,500 square feet (980 m^{2}) and with a staff of 19, the store was large in comparison to the standard health food store of the time.

On May 25, 1981, the most damaging flood in 100 years devastated Austin. Whole Foods' inventory was ruined, and most of the equipment was damaged. The loss was approximately $400,000, and Whole Foods Market had no insurance. Customers, neighbors, and staff assisted in repairing and cleaning up the damage. Creditors, vendors, and investors assisted in the recovery, and the store reopened 28 days later.

=== Expansion ===
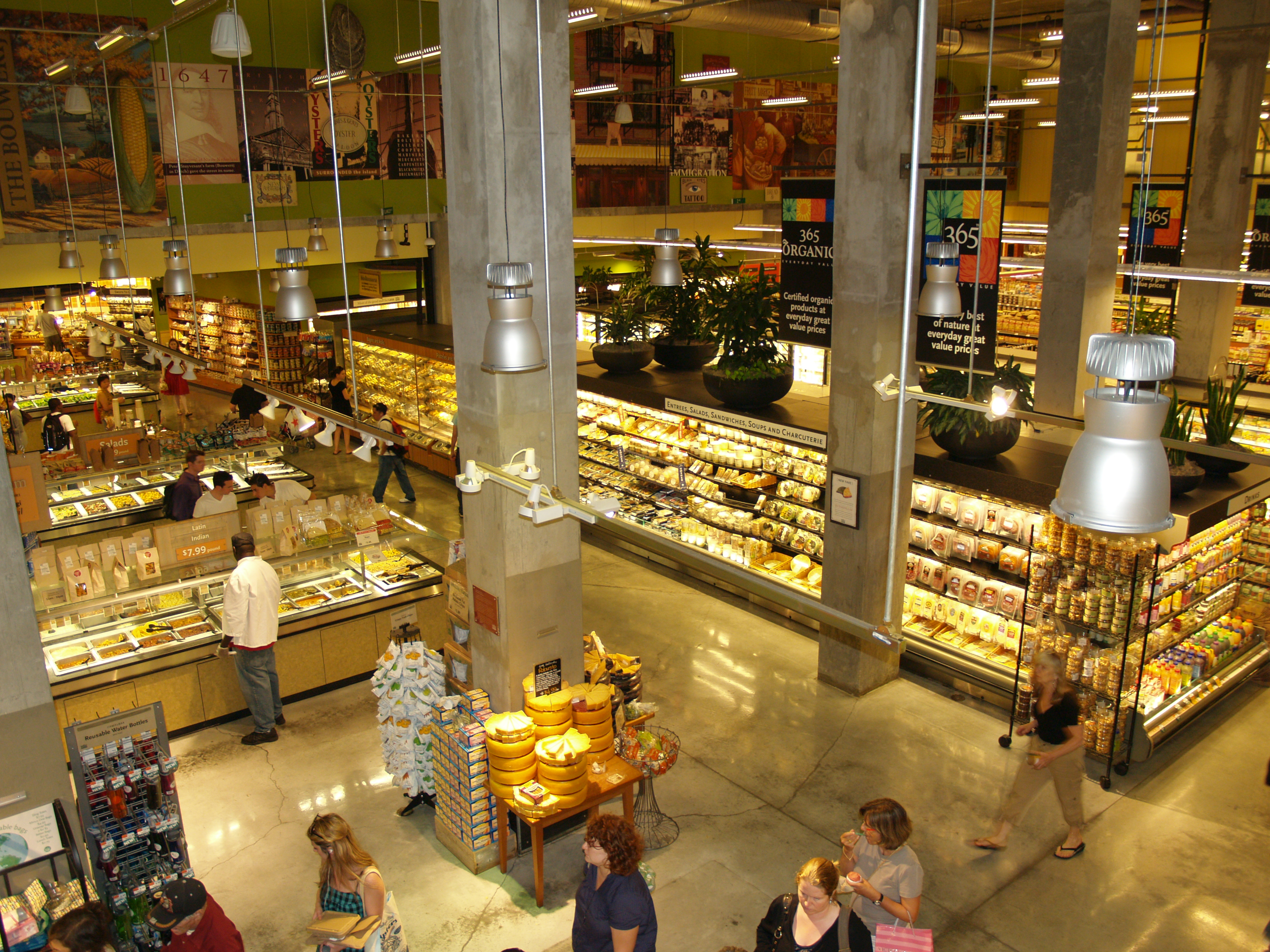
The Whole Foods Market on Bowery, in Manhattan, is the largest grocery store in New York City.

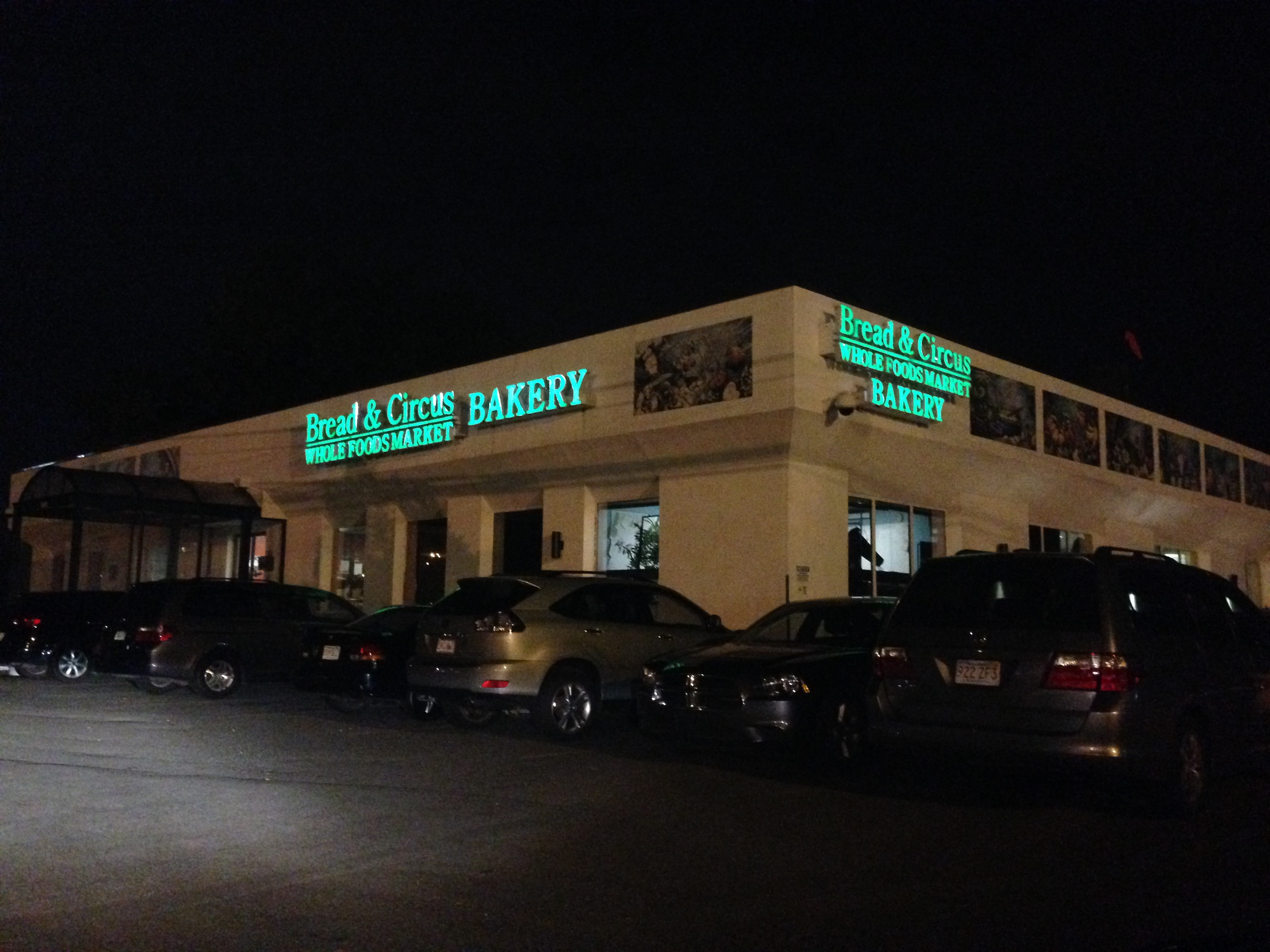
A Bread & Circus and Whole Foods bakery in Medford, Massachusetts

Beginning in 1984, Whole Foods Market expanded from Austin, first to Houston and Dallas and then to New Orleans with the purchase of The Whole Food Co. in 1988. In 1989, the company expanded to the West Coast with a store in Palo Alto, California.

The company made its initial public offering on January 23, 1992. The company's ticker symbol on the Nasdaq was WFM.

While opening new stores, the company fueled rapid growth by acquiring other natural foods chains throughout the 1990s: Wellspring Grocery of North Carolina, Bread & Circus of Massachusetts and Rhode Island (banner retired in 2003), Mrs. Gooch's Natural Foods Markets of Los Angeles, Bread of Life of Northern California, Fresh Fields Markets on the East Coast for $134,5 Million in stock,and in the Midwest, Bread of Life of Florida, Detroit-area Merchant of Vino stores, and Nature's Heartland of Boston. The company purchased Allegro Coffee Company in 1997. The company's 100th store was opened in Torrance, California, in 1999.

The company started its third decade with additional acquisitions. The first was Natural Abilities in 2000, which did business as Food for Thought in Northern California. After the departure of then company president Chris Hitt and regional president Rich Cundiff, Southern California region, John Mackey promoted A. C. Gallo, president of the Northeast region, and Walter Robb, president of the Northern California region to co-COO and soon after added the titles of co-president. This led to the promotion of three new regional presidents and a new era for the company. David Lannon became president of the Northeast region, Anthony Gilmore became president of the Southwest region, and Ron Megehan became the Northern California region, president. In 2001, Whole Foods also moved into Manhattan. Later that year, Ken Meyer became president of the newly formed South region and Whole Foods Market acquired the assets of Harry's Farmers Market, which included three stores in Atlanta. In 2002, the company continued its expansion in North America and opened its first store in Toronto, Ontario. Further continuing its expansion, Select Fish of Seattle was acquired in 2003.

In late 2004, it was reported that Whole Foods had "cleared $188 million in profits in the last two years."

In 2005, Whole Foods opened its 80,000 sq ft (7,400 m^{2}) flagship store in downtown Austin. The company's headquarters moved into offices above the store.

Whole Foods opened its first store in Hawaii in 2008 and in 2008 it also opened a southeast distribution center in Braselton, Georgia, calling it the first "green distribution center" for the company.

Along with new acquisitions, such as the 2014 purchase of seven Dominick's Finer Foods locations in Chicago, Whole Foods has also sold stores to other companies. For example, 35 Henry's Farmers Market and Sun Harvest Market stores were sold to a subsidiary of Los Angeles grocer Smart & Final Inc. for $166 million in 2007.

Whole Foods opened its second store in western New York in Amherst, a suburb of Buffalo in September 2017.

As part of a streamlining campaign, in January 2017, the company reported that it would close three remaining regional kitchens in Everett, Massachusetts; Landover, Maryland; and Atlanta, Georgia.

In June 2017, Amazon purchased Whole Foods Market for $13.7 billion. Amazon plans for Whole Foods customers who also have an Amazon Prime account to be able to order groceries online and then pick them up in store for free.

In January 2019, to facilitate expansion into previously unserved areas, Amazon announced plans to acquire some former Sears and Kmart locations from Sears Holdings, which filed for Chapter 11 Bankruptcy protection on October 15, 2018. These vacant locations would be demolished or remodeled to create new Whole Foods Market locations.

In April 2019, Whole Foods opened its largest store in the Southeast in Midtown Atlanta. The three-level store has a burger restaurant, an Allegro Coffee shop, and a rooftop terrace.

==== International expansion ====
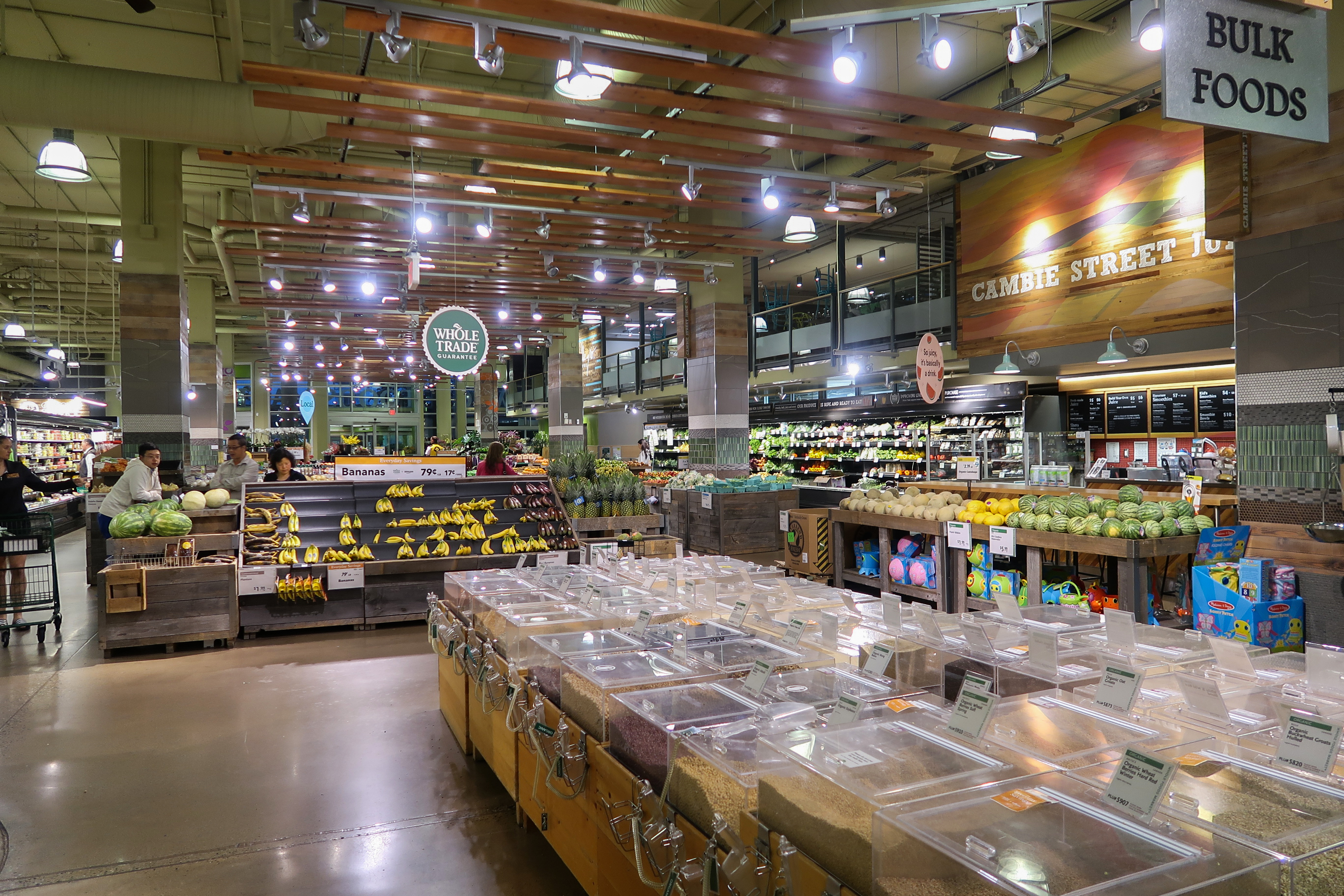
Whole Foods Market in Vancouver, British Columbia, Canada

Whole Foods entered the Canadian market in 2002 with a 40,000 sq ft (3,700 m^{2}) location in Toronto, at the upscale Hazelton Lanes shopping center in the city's Yorkville neighborhood. In 2013, with nine Whole Foods stores already running in Canada (all of them in Toronto and Vancouver area), the company's co-founder and CEO Mackey stated forecasts of opening 40 more stores in the country over an unspecified timeframe and eventually reaching $1-billion in annual Canadian sales. By January 2017—while announcing cancellation of 2015-2016 plans to open stores in Calgary and Edmonton—Whole Foods had 467 stores in three countries, majority of which were in the United States, except 9 in the United Kingdom and 12 in Canada. Among the twelve Canadian stores were five each in Greater Vancouver and Greater Toronto, and one each in Ottawa and Victoria. In March 2020 there were 487 stores in the US, 14 in Canada and 7 in the UK.

In 2004, Whole Foods Market entered the UK by acquiring seven Fresh & Wild stores. In June 2007, it opened its first full-size store, a total of 80,000 sq ft (7,400 m^{2}) on three levels, on the site of the old Barkers department store on Kensington High Street, West London and currently their largest store in the world. Company executives claimed that as many as forty stores might eventually be opened throughout the UK. However, by September 2008, in the wake of Whole Foods Market's financial troubles, Fresh & Wild had been reduced to four stores, all in London. The flagship Bristol branch closed because it had "not met profitability goals." In the year to September 28, 2008, the UK subsidiary lost £36 million due to a large impairment charge of £27 million and poor trading results due to the growing fears of a global recession. However, in 2011, global sales grew +8% each financial quarter as shoppers returned to the chain. A first Scottish store was opened on November 16, 2011, in Giffnock, Glasgow, which was closed in November 2017 along with the company's Cheltenham store as part of a rationalization plan. Whole Foods Market Inc. currently operates five different Whole Foods locations, all in Greater London: in Camden Town, Clapham Junction, Kensington, Piccadilly Circus and Stoke Newington.

==== Acquisition of Wild Oats Markets and antitrust complaint ====
On February 21, 2007, Whole Foods Market, Inc. and Wild Oats Markets Inc. announced the signing of a merger agreement under which Whole Foods Market, Inc. would acquire Wild Oats Markets Inc.'s outstanding common stock in a cash tender offer of $18.50 per share, or approximately $565 million based on fully diluted shares. Under the agreement, Whole Foods Market, Inc. would also assume Wild Oats Markets Inc.'s net debt totaling approximately $106 million as reported on September 30, 2006.

On June 27, 2007, the Federal Trade Commission (FTC) issued an administrative complaint challenging Whole Foods Market, Inc.'s acquisition of Wild Oats Markets Inc. According to the complaint, the FTC believed that the proposed transaction would violate federal antitrust laws by eliminating the substantial competition between two close competitors in the operation of premium natural and organic supermarkets nationwide. The FTC contended that if the transaction were to proceed, Whole Foods Market would have the ability to raise prices and reduce quality and services. Both Whole Foods Market and Wild Oats stated their intention to oppose the FTC's complaint vigorously, and a court hearing on the issue was scheduled for July 31 and August 1, 2007. CEO John Mackey started a blog on the subject to explain his opposition to the FTC's stance. Further blogging by Mackey was revealed when the FTC released papers detailing highly opinionated comments under the pseudonym "Rahodeb" that he made to the Whole Foods Yahoo! investment message board. This became the subject of an investigation when the Securities and Exchange Commission (SEC) noted that the Regulation Fair Disclosure law of 2000 may have been violated. The SEC cleared Mackey of the charges on April 25, 2008.

On July 29, 2008, the Court of Appeals for the District of Columbia overturned the district court's decision to allow the merger. The Court of Appeals ruled that "premium natural, and organic supermarkets" ("PNOS"), such as Whole Foods and Wild Oats, constitute a distinct submarket of all grocers. The court ruled that "mission-driven" consumers (those with an emphasis on social and environmental responsibility) would be adversely affected by the merger because substantial evidence by the FTC showed that Whole Foods intended to raise prices after the consummation of the merger. As part of its effort to combat the ruling, Whole Foods subpoenaed financial records, market studies, and future strategic plans belonging to New Seasons Market, a regional competitor based in the Portland area. In 2009, Whole Foods agreed to sell the Wild Oats chain.

=== 2017–present: Amazon subsidiary ===
Interior of a Whole Foods Market in Crystal City, Virginia, in 2019, featuring Amazon branding

In February 2017, Whole Foods said it would close nine stores and lowered its financial projections for the year as the natural-foods company struggled with increased competition and slowing sales growth. In late April 2017, Whole Foods reported their sixth consecutive quarter of declining sales and announced that the company would be closing nine stores: two each in Colorado and California, and one each in Georgia, Arizona, Utah, New Mexico, and Illinois. The loss of revenue was attributed to foot traffic being down and other supermarkets offering a similar experience for a lower cost.

In June 2017, Amazon announced it would acquire Whole Foods Market, adding some 400 physical stores to Amazon's e-commerce assets. The purchase was valued at $13.7 billion and caused Whole Foods's stock price to soar after the announcement was made.

In 2018, Whole Foods announced its possible intention to take over some vacant Sears and Kmart stores and refurbish them after Sears Holdings Corporation, which owned both chains, filed for bankruptcy in October.

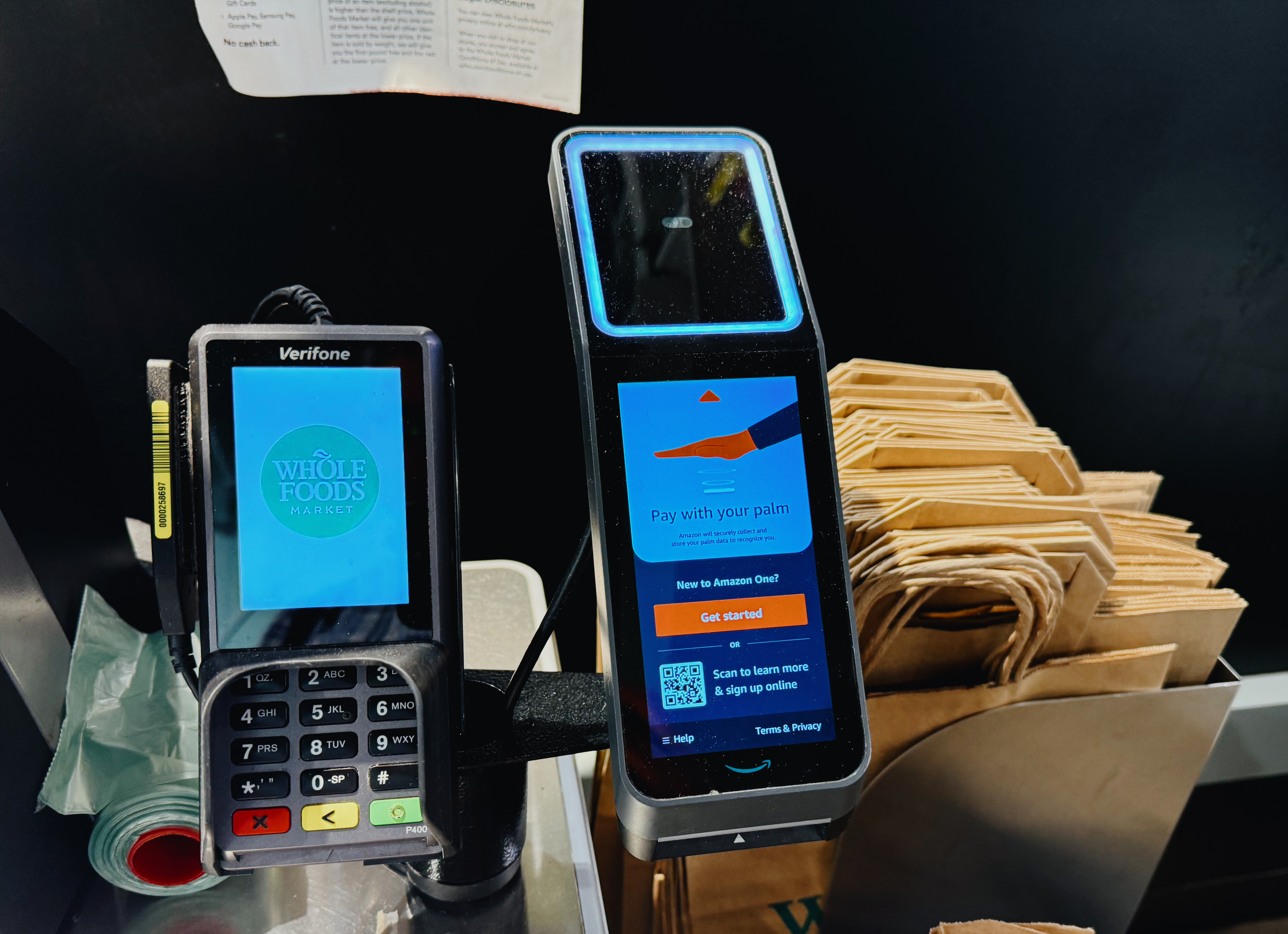
Amazon One biometric payment system at a Whole Foods store in Washington, D.C.

In April 2022, Whole Foods in Austin, Texas, began allowing consumers to make purchases by scanning their palms. The system uses the Amazon One system connected to a customer's debit or credit card.

In September 2022, John Mackey stepped down from his position as CEO of the company, one he held since its inception in 1980. Jason Buechel succeeded him. Buechel previously was executive vice president and chief information officer (CIO) between 2013 and 2019, followed by a tenure as chief operating officer (COO) from 2019 until his promotion in 2022.

In March 2024, Whole Foods announced they will close their Fulham and Richmond stores in the UK, as well as their distribution center in Dartford. The Amazon-owned supermarket also announced that they have signed a lease for a new store on King's Road in London's Chelsea, expected to open its doors in 2025.

In January 2025 workers at a Whole Foods Market in Philadelphia voted to become the first unionized store in the grocery chain, hoping that a union could help negotiate higher wages and better benefits. Whole Foods said it was "disappointed" by the unionization. In February 2025, Whole Foods asked the National Labor Relations Board to reject the results of the union election, making unspecified allegations that the election was invalid.

== Product quality ==
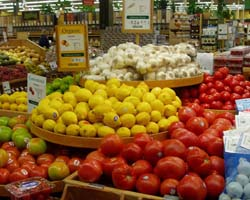
Produce in a Cary, North Carolina, store

Whole Foods Market sells only products that meet its internally developed, proprietary quality standards for being "natural," which the store defines as minimally processed foods that are free of hydrogenated fats as well as artificial flavors, colors, sweeteners, preservatives, and many others as listed on their online "Unacceptable Food Ingredients" list. Whole Foods also stated its intent not to sell meat or milk from cloned animals or their offspring, even though the U.S. Food and Drug Administration (FDA) has ruled them safe to eat.

The company also sells many USDA-certified organic foods and products that aim to be environmentally friendly and ecologically responsible. Stores do not carry foie gras or eggs from hens confined to battery cages due to animal cruelty concerns as a result of successful advocacy by animal welfare groups. The Whole Foods website details the company's criteria for selling food, dietary supplements, and personal care products.

Until June 2011, body care products sold at Whole Foods could be marketed as organic even if they contained ingredients not listed by the USDA as acceptable for use in organic food. "Products made using petroleum-derived and other synthetic or chemical ingredients, prohibited in organic foods, can be found among the organic shampoos and lotions made by Avalon, Nature's Gate, Jason Natural Cosmetics, Kiss My Face and other brands," said Urvashi Rangan, an environmental health scientist at Consumer Reports. This is because the federal guidelines that regulate organic food labeling do not apply to cosmetics. Starting in June 2011, personal care products sold at Whole Foods Market were required to follow the same USDA National Organic Program standards for organic food. This required products labeled "Organic" to contain 95 percent or more certified organic ingredients.

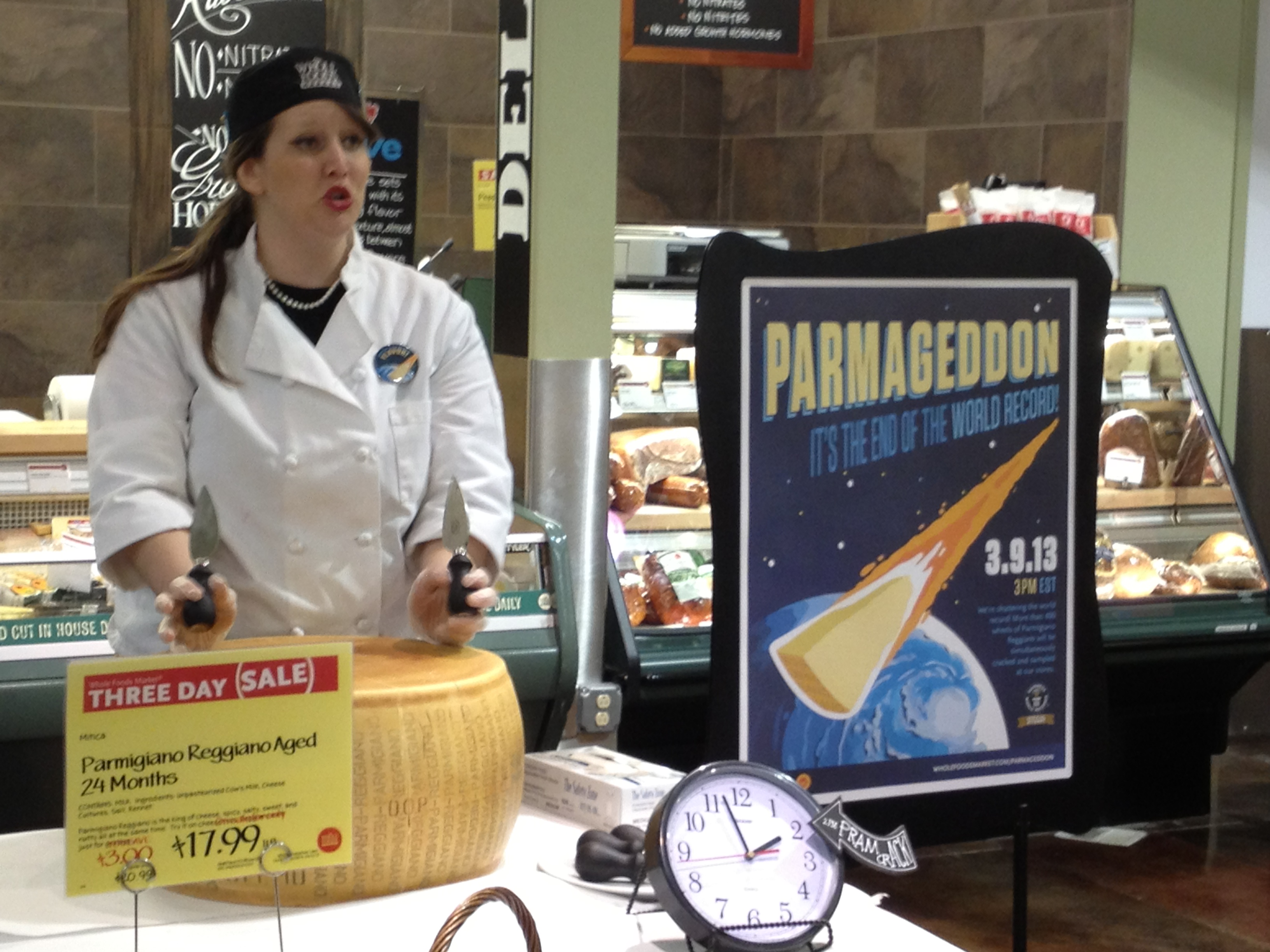
Opening a wheel of Parmigiano-Reggiano cheese at Whole Foods Market in Overland Park, Kansas

In a Wall Street Journal article in August 2009, John Mackey acknowledged that his company had lost touch with its natural food roots and would attempt to reconnect with the idea that health was affected by the quality of food consumed. He said, "We sell a bunch of junk." He stated that the company would focus more on health education in its stores. As of 2013, many stores have employed Healthy Eating Specialists who are team members who "answer customers' healthy eating questions and can assist ... in choosing the most nutrient-dense ingredients, suggest satisfying healthy recipes," and help "create a meal plan in keeping with your health goals."

In early April 2025, the bakery, deli, and cooked foods sections of Whole Foods in Cupertino, California, were closed down by local health authorities due to repeated violations and failure to remediate the presence of rodents and rodent droppings.

== Rating systems ==
Whole Foods Market has developed several in-store rating systems for various departments to allow their customers full transparency in purchasing. The Seafood department has a Sustainability Rating System for wild-caught seafood while farm-raised seafood has to meet aquaculture standards both rated in accordance to third-party auditors. The Meat department has a rating system in partnership with the Global Animal Partnership based on animal welfare. The produce department has a rating system based on farming practices which include measures of a farm's environment, GMO transparency, worker safety, and wage practices. The grocery department has an Eco-scale rating system for its cleaning products which measures their environmental impact. Each system is in place to allow customers to make the most educated choices within Whole Foods Market. There are efforts to create more rating systems in other departments.

== GMO product labeling ==
Whole Foods Market has announced plans to provide its customers GMO (genetically modified organism) product labeling by 2018. Efforts of GMO transparency run the gamut of each department. For years, Non-GMO Project Verified items have been sought in Grocery. While efforts continue in Produce, Whole Foods recommends buying organic or referring to their "Responsibly Grown produce rating system [which] requires growers to disclose the use of GMO seeds or plant material." In Seafood, plans are being made to launch a Non-GMO Project Verification process for farm-raised fish. Currently, there are no USDA Organic regulations for farmed seafood.

== Purchasing ==
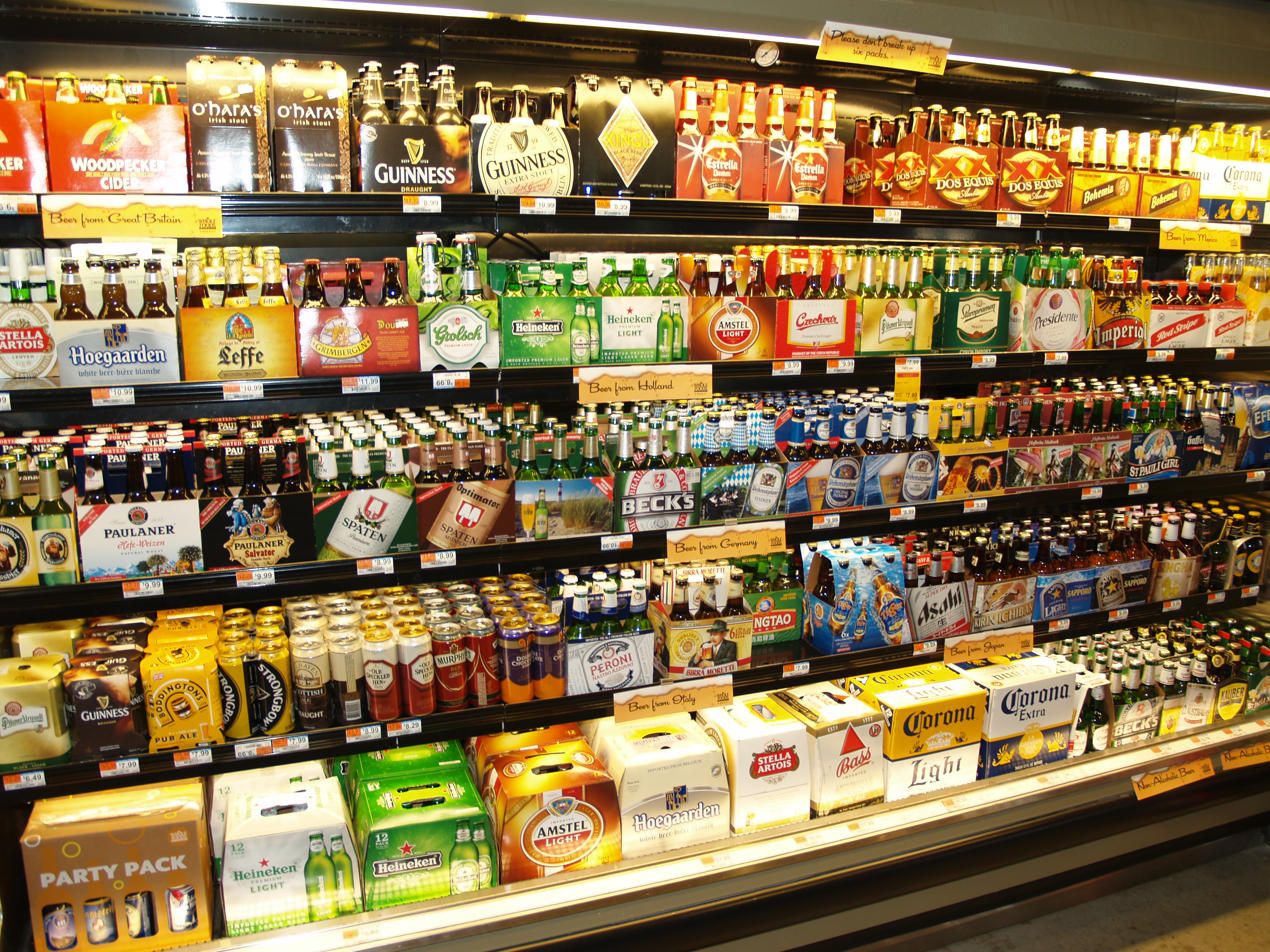
Whole Foods Market has opened wine and beer shops to cater to their upmarket brand. Above, the imported beer case at a Whole Foods beer shop.

Whole Foods Market purchases products for retail sale from local, regional, and international wholesale suppliers and vendors. Most purchasing occurs at the regional and national levels to negotiate volume discounts with major vendors and distributors. Regional and store buyers focus on local products and any unique products necessary to ensure a neighborhood market feel. Whole Foods says that the company is committed to buying from local producers that meet its quality standards while also increasingly focusing more of its purchasing on producer- and manufacture-direct programs. Some regions have an employee known as a "forager," whose sole duty is to source local products for each store.

=== Whole Trade Guarantee ===
In April 2007, Whole Foods Market launched the Whole Trade Guarantee, a purchasing initiative emphasizing ethics and social responsibility concerning products imported from the developing world. The criteria include fair prices for crops, environmentally sound practices, better wages and labor conditions for workers, and the stipulation that one percent of proceeds from Whole Trade-certified products go to the Whole Planet Foundation to support micro-loan programs in developing countries. The company's goal, published in 2007, is to have at least half of its imported products from these countries fully certified by 2017.

== Efforts ==
Whole Foods Market has a policy of donating at least five percent of its annual net profits to charitable causes. Some of this mandate is accomplished through store-level donations held on certain "5% days" throughout the year. The rest of it comes from various targeted projects by the company.

=== Environmental involvement ===
In May 1999, Whole Foods Market joined the Marine Stewardship Council (MSC), a global independent, not-for-profit organization promoting sustainable fisheries and responsible fishing practices worldwide to help preserve fish stocks for future generations. The company first began selling MSC-certified seafood in 2000, and a growing selection of MSC-certified fish continues to be available.

Whole Foods placed third on the U.S. Environmental Protection Agency's "Top 25 Green Power Partners". The company also received the EPA Green Power Award in 2004 and 2005 and the Partner of the Year award in 2006 and 2007. A January 8, 2007, Environmental Protection Agency (EPA) report listed Whole Foods Market as the second-highest purchaser of green power nationwide, citing its actions as helping drive the development of new renewable energy sources for the electricity generation. The EPA report showed Whole Foods Market using 463.1 million kilowatt hours annually. It was covered, 100 percent net-wise, by its total electricity from biomass, geothermal, small hydro, solar, and wind sources.

In August 2024, Whole Foods dairy suppliers were planning a pilot program with Windfall Bio, a startup company with financing from the Amazon Climate Pledge Fund, Breakthrough Energy Ventures, Mayfield, and others, to add microbes to the soil of their farms that consume methane emissions to produce fertilizer.

=== Energy ===
Whole Foods Market claims several energy efficient initiatives on the store website, including installing electric vehicle charging stations, harnessing solar energy, achieving green building certificates, using green refrigeration, and designing grocery stores of the future.

In 2006 Whole Foods Market was amongst the first retailers, and the first Fortune 500 company, to offset 100% of their emissions by purchasing Renewable Energy Credits (RECs). Skepticism surrounding this purchase and RECs as a whole have been prevalent online. Harvard Business Review writes that "the money paid to purchase those RECs, in theory, subsidizes the higher cost of producing clean electricity, making this alternative competitive, or creates a market mechanism that will cause more renewables to be produced." The energy produced by wind farms that are benefactors of RECs is distributed to the same power grid as energy from fossil fuels, making the success of RECs difficult to track and quantify. Energy policy researcher Michael Gillenwater states that "claims that the U.S. green power market result in additional wind power lack credibility." A 2022 study found that the purchasing of RECs inflates the actual value of this environmental commodity in terms of limiting emissions.

Whole Foods Market also has several stores that function entirely on UTC power fuel cells on-site. One of the company's Mississippi locations plans on utilizing a local wind farm funded by Amazon to source the store's energy needs. In the case study of a Raleigh, North Carolina Whole Foods Market, the company worked with the U.S. Department of Energy's Commercial Building Partnerships to plan and evaluate the construction of an extremely energy-efficient building, which if successful, would have been rolled out to other locations. Whole Foods Market is also working with the Environmental Protection Agency's GreenChill program to reduce refrigerant emissions. Refrigeration is extremely energy-intensive, leading the company to start using a refrigerant with a 68% lower global warming potential than the most commonly used refrigerants.

Whole Foods signed an agreement with SolarCity to install solar panels on up to 100 stores. In 2015 the company was named in the top 25 companies by number of solar installations. Whole Foods also reduced their energy usage by 21% between 2010 and 2021.

Whole Foods Market extends their energy initiatives globally. The company's non-profit organization, Whole Planet, which aims to alleviate poverty also pertains to climate mitigation. In 2023 the company announced that they would fund the distribution of solar home kits across Sierra Leone, making energy more accessible with a Pay-as-you-Go model.

=== Eliminating plastic ===
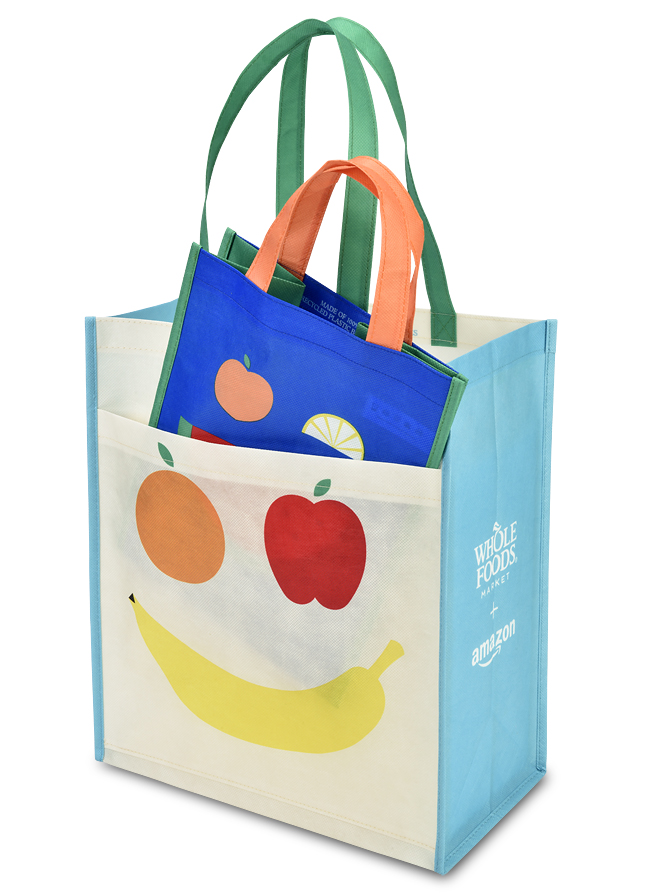
Reusable bags made by KeepCool USA and sold by Whole Foods Market in spring 2018

In January 2008, Whole Foods Market was the first U.S. supermarket to commit to eliminating disposable plastic grocery bags to help protect the environment and conserve resources, and many stores serve as a collection point for shoppers to recycle their plastic bags.

On Earth Day, April 22, 2008, the chain eliminated the use of disposable plastic grocery bags company-wide at point-of-purchase in favor of reusable bags or paper bags made from recycled paper. The company also began offering "Better Bags", large, colorful grocery bags made primarily from recycled bottles. The move from the traditional paper/plastic system to reusable bags has been packaged as an initiative the company calls "BYOB – Bring Your Own Bag". The campaign is aimed at reducing pollution by eliminating plastic bags and reducing waste by encouraging bag reuse with "bag refunds" of 5–10 cents, depending on the store.

However, it still offers single-use plastic bags in its produce department and does little to discourage persistent use by customers and Amazon Prime Now shoppers alike.

=== Treatment of animals ===
Whole Foods created the Animal Compassion Foundation in January 2005 to help other producers evolve their practices to raise animals naturally and humanely. On December 5, 2014, the organization registration was canceled. In 2008, Whole Foods created the Global Animal Partnership (G.A.P.) and says that "all fresh beef, pork, chicken, turkey and lamb (except kosher turkey and chicken) must be certified to meet 100+ animal welfare standards" set by the organization.

Whole Foods announced in June 2006 that it would stop selling live lobsters and crabs, but in February 2007, made an exception for a Portland, Maine, store for its ability to meet "humane standards". The lobsters are kept in private compartments instead of being piled on top of one another in a tank, and employees use a device that gives them a 120-volt shock so that they are not boiled alive in a pot of water. This decision was criticized by ex-lobsterman Trevor Corson as damaging a New England tradition and as removing people's connection to where their food comes from. In 2022, Whole Foods said it would temporarily stop selling Maine lobsters due to sustainability issues and a possible risk to whales.

In May 2014, Whole Foods launched a pilot program to sell rabbit meat in 5 of its 12 market regions. Because domestic rabbits are the eighth most common pet in the United States as well as an animal rescued and sheltered alongside cats and dogs, this decision triggered a nationwide boycott of Whole Foods by the vegetarian activist House Rabbit Society and their supporters. In June 2014 Whole Foods awarded a financial grant to Oz Family Farms, a family-owned rabbit meat business.

In January 2015, a group of activists organized under the network Direct Action Everywhere (DxE) released a video of laying hens from a Northern California farm that supplies eggs to Whole Foods. In the video, which featured footage of crowded, dirty henhouses and injured birds, DxE contended that the hens' welfare was severely compromised, even though numerous boards had labeled the farm as "Certified Humane".

In 2015, animal rights groups People for the Ethical Treatment of Animals (PETA) and DxE released investigations criticizing Whole Foods animal welfare standards and accusing Whole Foods suppliers of animal cruelty. After the release of its investigation, PETA joined other animal welfare organizations in a letter to Whole Foods, writing that "Under the guise of compassion, Whole Foods is profiting from violence against animals." PETA co-founder Ingrid Newkirk also criticized Whole Foods' animal welfare, arguing that supposed welfare failures indicate a need for animal rights rather than welfare. Whole Foods has come under harsh criticism from abolitionist vegans such as Gary L. Francione who view the company's policies as a betrayal of the animal rights position.

In 2015, during a PETA investigation of Whole Foods pork supplier Sweet Stem Farm LLC, in Lancaster County, Pennsylvania, video showed pigs living in a dark structure, not allowed access to the outdoors. Some animals were shown lifted by their ears, lying sick or injured, and hauled away dead. In a statement, Whole Foods cited a commitment to their G.A.P. program and, after visiting the supplier, "did not see the issues PETA alleged".

Another Whole Foods supplier, Plainville Farms, was suspended from the G.A.P. program following the release of a video from a 2021 PETA investigation, showing turkeys being kicked, stomped, and thrown by workers at Pennsylvania farms. Law enforcement charged twelve men with 141 counts of animal cruelty, including six felonies, which marks the largest number of animal cruelty charges in a U.S. factory farm case. Plainville said it would cooperate with the investigation, but PETA said the company was not doing enough to keep the public informed about how turkeys are raised. Two of the men charged pleaded guilty and were sentenced in 2023.

Also in 2023, PETA called on Whole Foods to stop selling coconut milk from Thailand. The protest campaign followed a multi-year investigation, where PETA revealed that monkeys in Thailand are forced to climb tall trees for hours and to pick coconuts used to produce products such as milk, flour and oil. In November 2022, PETA released video showing monkeys chained to trees and forced to pick coconuts and workers beating some of them. The Thai Embassy subsequently reported that more than 25,000 retailers worldwide had since stopped carrying coconut milk from Thailand.

=== Toxins ===
In February 2006, shareholders of Whole Foods filed a resolution asking Whole Foods to report toxic chemicals found in its products. Substances such as Bisphenol A (BPA), found in products such as baby bottles and children's cups, are controversial. Whole Foods no longer sells baby bottles and children's cups made with BPA.

In the wake of concern over the safety of seafood imports from China, on July 10, 2007, The Washington Post reported that Whole Foods imports a small amount of frozen shrimp from China, accounting for less than 2% of the company's total seafood sales. A Whole Foods spokesperson addressed the issue, saying, "We're not concerned about the less than 2 percent. It's business as usual for us."

In September 2018, Whole Foods was ordered to pay $1,643,500 due to "mishandling of hazardous wastes and materials included batteries, electronic devices, ignitable liquids, aerosol products, cleaning agents, and other flammable, reactive, and toxic materials" at its California stores over the prior five years.

== Public image and legal issues ==
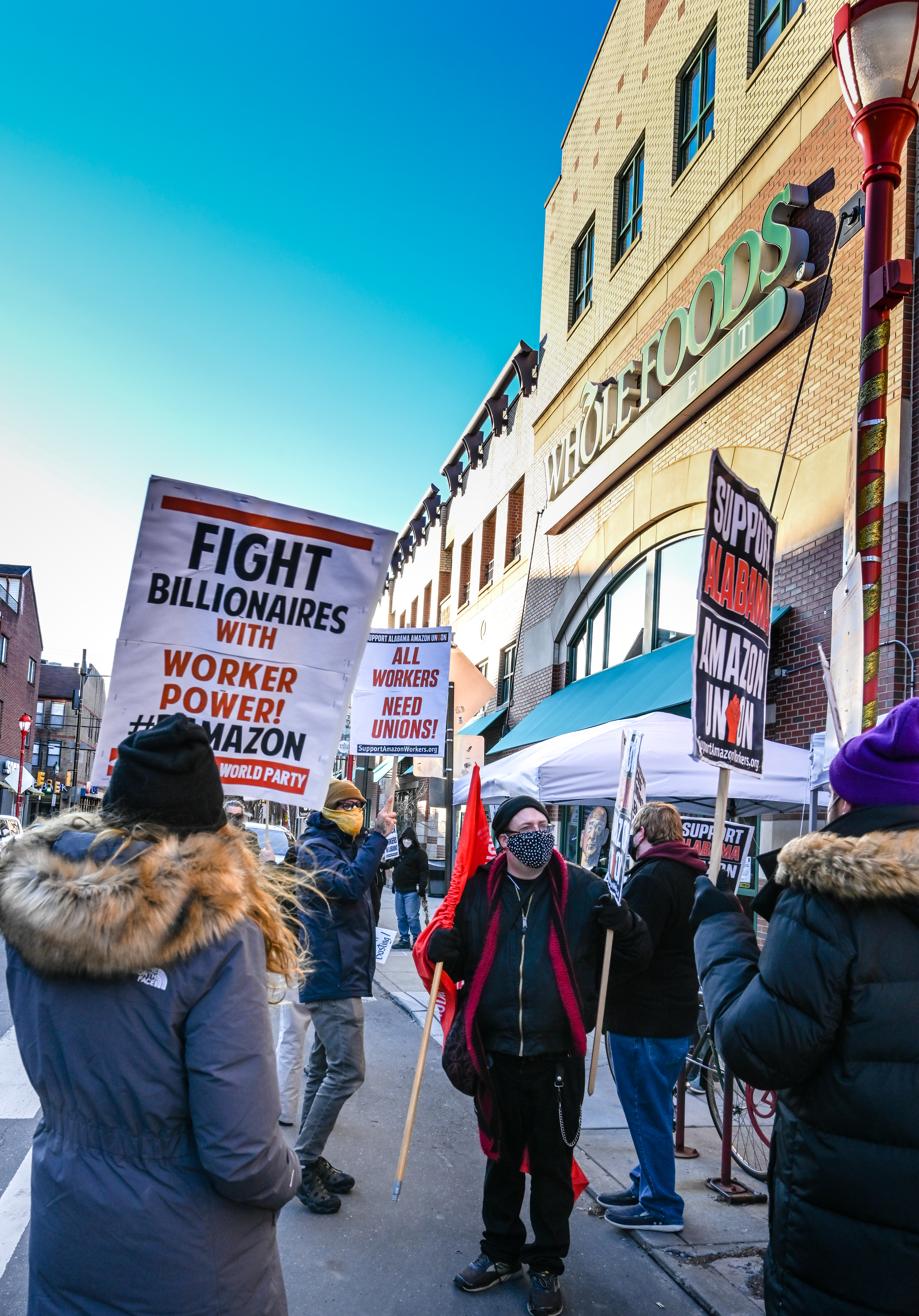
Picketing in front of a Whole Foods Market in Philadelphia, PA

Whole Foods Market is considered anti-labor by most worker organizations, and it has been criticized that its products may not be as progressive as they are touted to be. Author Michael Pollan has contended that the supermarket chain has done well in expanding the organic market but has done so at the cost of local foods, regional producers, and distributors. Parts of the debate have taken place publicly through a series of letters between Pollan and Whole Foods CEO John Mackey.

Ronnie Cummins, national director of the United States Organic Consumers Association, opined that "Whole Foods Market now is a big-box retailer – and it's much more concerned about competing with the other big boxes than issues of ethics and sustainability." Similarly, researcher Stacy Mitchell of the New Rules Project argues that the corporation's aggressive marketing of local food is more hype than substance.

Whole Foods has frequently been the subject of resistance or boycotts in response to proposed store locations. The corporation has also been criticized for its aggressive policy of promoting its own in-house brands (e.g., 365) at the expense of smaller or local independent brands.

On August 11, 2009, Whole Foods co-founder and CEO John Mackey published an editorial in The Wall Street Journal criticizing the Patient Protection and Affordable Care Act; the editorial was controversial in the natural foods community. On December 24, 2009, Mackey resigned from the position of chairman of the board of the company, a position he held since 1978. On his blog, he wrote, "John Elstrott will now take the title of Chairman of the Board, which will accurately reflect the authority and the responsibilities that he has had for many years." Mackey remains a member of the board of directors as of 2012. Whole Foods's current CEO is Jason Buechel.

The company has created other controversies at various times involving business practices, labor issues, product selection, and failure to support farmers and suppliers. In March 2013, Whole Foods promised to label GMO-containing products in North American stores by 2018. The company has drawn criticism for questionable science behind the claims of benefit of its products, including encouraging and selling drugs that are described to work under homeopathic principles.

In 2013, two workers in Albuquerque, New Mexico, were suspended for speaking Spanish. The resulting investigation revealed that Whole Foods has a policy of speaking "English to customers and other Team Members while on the clock". The company soon revised this policy.

In 2014, Whole Foods agreed to pay an $800,000 settlement in response to allegations that its California stores were charging more per weight than what its labels indicated. The company continued this practice despite the settlement, with investigators alleging thousands of continued violations well into 2015. In 2015, the CEOs made a public admission of the practice happening in New York after a New York City Department of Consumer Affairs investigation.

Whole Foods has faced other lawsuits in California over the presence of carcinogens. In March 2008, following a study by the Organic Consumers Association, reports of high levels of 1,4-Dioxane found in body care products at Whole Foods prompted the Attorney General of California to file a lawsuit against the company for a violation of Proposition 65. Civil penalties of up to $2,500 a day were expected to be awarded. The action claimed that 365, along with brands sold by other cosmetic companies, did not include a label warning about the chemical; spokesperson Libba Letton stated that the company did "not believe that these products represent a health risk or are in excess of California's Proposition 65 Safe Harbor level for 1,4-Dioxane" while consumer activist David Steinman urged them to "stop treating the inclusion of cancer-causing chemicals in their products as 'business as usual'". Proposition 65 was invoked again in 2013 when the state again sued Whole Foods, and other retailers over the presence of lead in certain candies.

In January 2016, SJ Collins Enterprises, a developer who often works with Whole Foods, petitioned the Sarasota County board of county commissioners to allow the removal of a five-acre protected wetlands so that they could build a surface parking lot for a planned Whole Foods shopping center and Wawa gas station at the intersection of University Parkway and Honore Avenue. The county commission voted 4–1 to allow the re-zoning and accept 41 acres of replacement wetlands. The lone commissioner voting against the proposal, Charles Hines, stated that approval of the petition could create a domino effect leading to the destruction of other protected areas.

In June 2016, US food safety inspectors warned the company that violations discovered at Whole Foods' Everett, Massachusetts, plant could result in food being "contaminated with filth or rendered injurious to health".

In April 2018, Whole Foods Market faced social media backlash over the opening of the third location of the independent restaurant chain, "Yellow Fever", in a Whole Foods 365 store in Long Beach, California, for possible racist undertones.

In April 2020, Business Insider revealed extensive monitoring of stores to identify and target unionization, using a metric based on racial diversity, employee loyalty, turnover and more.

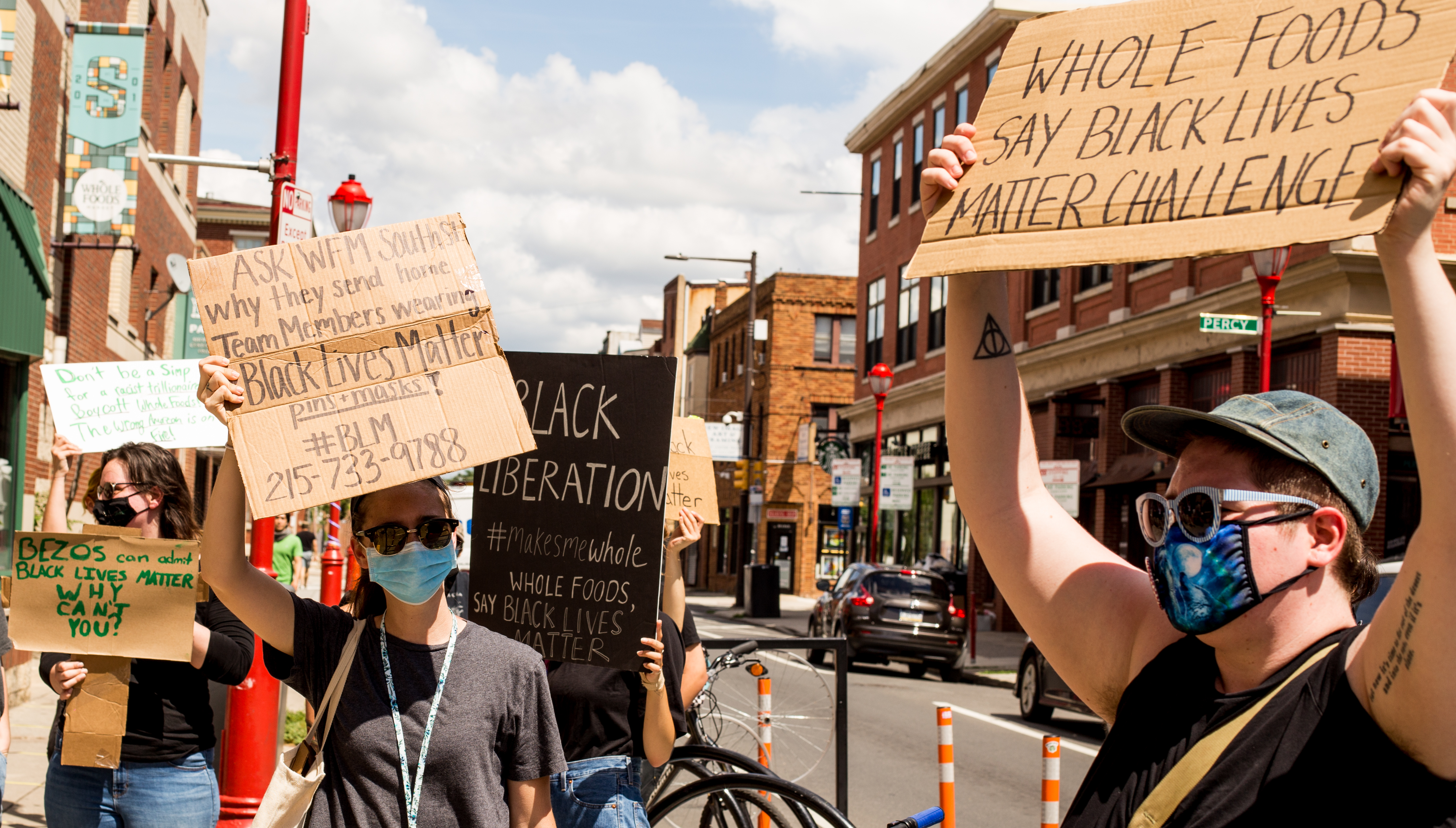
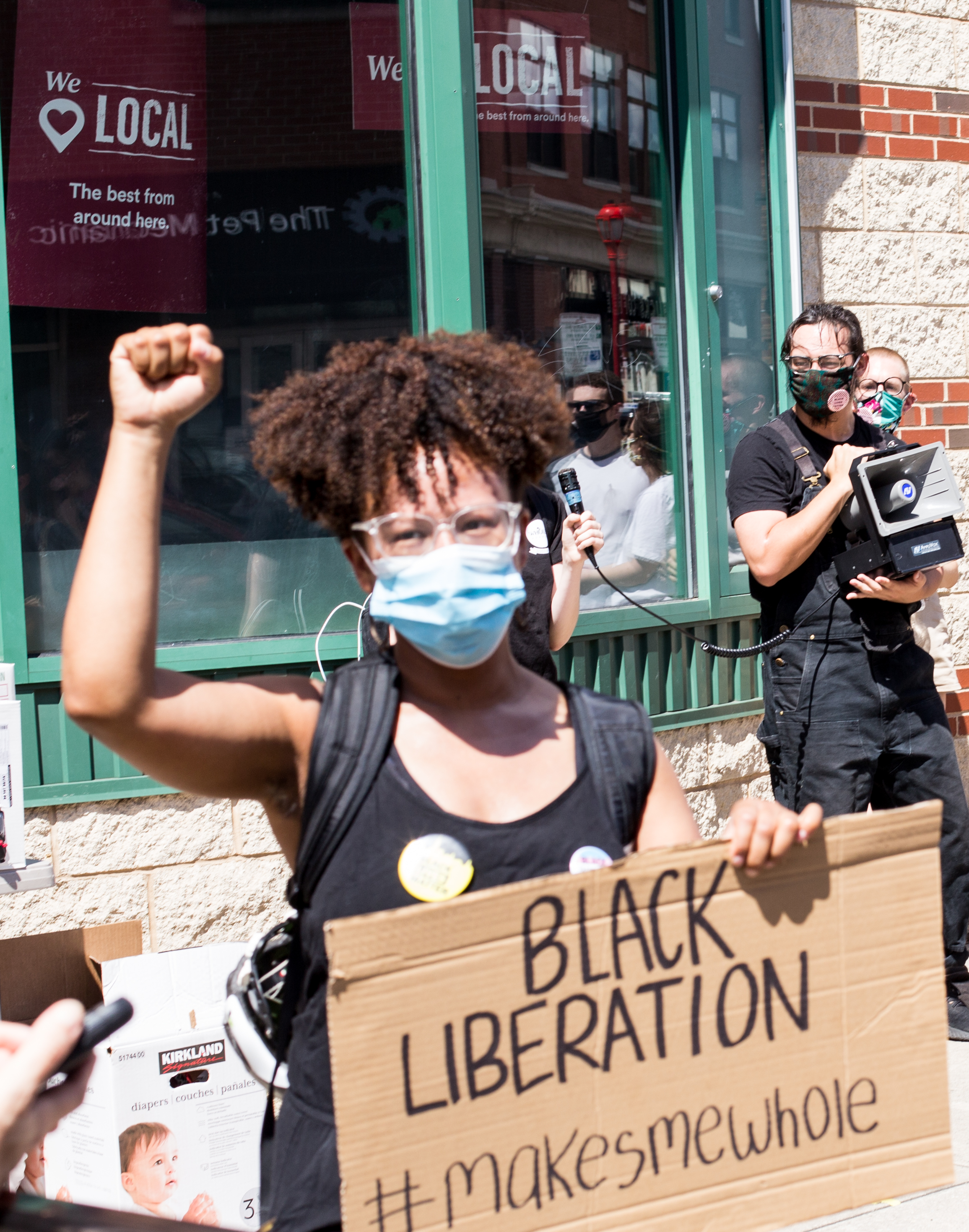
Whole Foods Market protest on Black Lives Matter clothing policy

In June 2020, two employees said they were sent home for wearing masks that stated "I can't breathe" and "Black Lives Matter". A Whole Foods spokesperson stated that "all Whole Foods Market Team Members have signed acknowledgments of our longstanding company dress code, which prohibits any visible slogans, messages, logos or advertising that are not company-related, on any article of clothing, including face masks".

In November 2020, Whole Foods banned Canadian employees from wearing a Remembrance Day poppy, the national symbol of remembrance worn by Canadians on Remembrance Day. On November 6, 2020, the House of Commons of Canada unanimously adopted a motion "to condemn Whole Foods and its owner Jeff Bezos for banning its employees from wearing poppies on their uniform". The same day, Whole Foods reversed its policy, saying "Given the learnings of today, we are welcoming Team Members to wear the poppy pin in honour of Remembrance Day."

Whole Foods has been criticized for "humanewashing", or misleading animal welfare labeling, on its meat, dairy, and egg products. In 2024, international farmed animal protection organization Mercy For Animals accused Whole Foods of humanewashing and lacking transparency regarding the company's plans for fulfilling its pledge to stop sourcing fast-growing broiler chicken breeds, also known as "Frankenchickens", by 2024. Whole Foods' 2023 impact report states that higher-welfare breeds constituted only 4.42% of fresh chicken units sold in 2023, just one year before the company's commitment deadline for reaching 100%. Despite continuing to tout its pledge, Whole Foods has yet to add a time-bound plan for implementing its breed policy to its public chicken welfare roadmap.

In March 2025, a federal class-action lawsuit was filed against Whole Foods supplier Alexandre Family Farm, as well as the certifier Humane Farm Animal Care. The lawsuit alleged that the "Certified Humane" label used on the farm's dairy products is deceptive, and that that the operation's practices violated the certifier's own standards. Alexandre Family Farm has denied allegations of systemic cruelty, maintaining that the identified issues were isolated incidents and that their practices remain in line with humane standards.

== Awards and recognition ==
Whole Foods Market was included in Fortune magazine's annual list of the "100 Best Companies to Work For" yearly from the list's inception in 1998 to being placed number 44 in 2014. The chain has also won a number of awards for social responsibility including a first-place ranking by Harris Interactive / The Wall Street Journal in 2006 and British trade magazine The Grocer named it the "World's Greatest Food Retailer" the same year. It has received past spots on the "100 Best Corporate Citizens" list published by Corporate Responsibility Officer. In 2014, Supermarket News ranked Whole Foods number 19 on its list of "Top 75 North American Retailers."

== Labor relations and anti-union activism ==
Among its core values, the company lists "supporting team member happiness and excellence." The company maintains that its treatment of workers obviates the need for labor unions: At its U.S. stores, after 800 service hours, full-time workers are given an option to purchase health insurance coverage starting at $20 per paycheck for themselves, and spouse and dependent coverage for an additional charge.

Whole Foods' health insurance plan is notable for its high deductibles – $2000 for general medical expenses and $1000 for prescriptions. However, employees receive $300 to $1800 per year (depending on years of service) in personal wellness funds. Once an employee has met the deductibles, insurance covers 80% of general medical costs and prescriptions but not for any type of mental illness. CEO Mackey drew attention to the insurance program (offered through UnitedHealthcare in the US) for its employees in an op-ed in The Wall Street Journal. In the article he called his company's insurance plan a viable alternative to "Obamacare". Mackey summed up his antipathy toward universal coverage in his op-ed by stating:

A careful reading of both the Declaration of Independence and the Constitution will not reveal any intrinsic right to health care, food, or shelter. That's because there isn't any. This "right" has never existed in America.

A "Boycott Whole Foods" page on Facebook was created in response to John Mackey's position on health care.

Mackey, a libertarian, believes that unions facilitate an adversarial relationship between management and labor. An attempt at unionizing in Madison, Wisconsin, in 2002 was met with resistance from store management, and Labor activists accused whole Foods of union busting. Employees at the Madison store voted in favor of unionization. Whole Foods then refused to bargain with its employees. After a year, the company moved to decertify the union. Further attempts at unionizing Whole Foods Market stores have been unsuccessful. Whole Foods launched a nationwide campaign, requiring workers to attend "Union Awareness Training," complete with PowerPoint presentations.

Whole Foods was criticized for its refusal to support a campaign by the United Farm Workers (UFW) on behalf of agricultural workers laboring on strawberry farms. During the late 1990s, the UFW persuaded several supermarket chains to sign a pledge in support of improved wages and working conditions for strawberry pickers. Whole Foods chose instead to support the farm workers indirectly by holding a "National 5% Day" where five percent of that day's sales – $125,000 – was donated to organizations that provide social services to farmworkers.

In September 2015, Whole Foods announced layoffs of 1,500 jobs, 1.6 percent of its workforce, to lower prices. Over the next two months, the eliminated jobs would come from regional and store positions.

Whole Foods hired the Labor Relations Consulting or "union busting" company Kulture Consulting, LLC on May 23, 2016. This was in response to a union election at a Whole Foods distribution center in Florida. A member of the National Labor Relations Board (NLRB) wrote that Kulture's CEO and founder Peter List had "in his effort to 'persuade' workers...engaged in 'patently unlawful' activities" during a 2007 organizing campaign.

In September 2019, Whole Foods announced it would cut the health benefits of part-time workers, affecting 2% of the workforce or 1,900 employees.

In January 2025, a Whole Foods in Philadelphia voted to form a union. In April, several open union supporters were fired and alleged that their termination was retaliatory, and they were targeted due to their support of the unionization campaign.

== Management system ==
=== Employee structure and culture ===
Whole Foods Market consists of twelve geographic regions, each with its own president, regional administrative team, store-level leadership, and store-level team members. A 4-tier hierarchy of employment exists within the Whole Foods Company: Store Employment, Facilities Employment, Regional Offices, and Global Headquarters.

=== Employee benefits and incentives ===
To help employees learn about products, the company has instituted a mentoring program and developed an online portal called "Whole Foods Market University" to aid in training. Internal parlance refers to "team leaders" instead of "managers," and stores sometimes offer prizes for competing teams. A 2014 analysis of 2012 figures found that Whole Foods Market was "among the least generous companies" in terms of its 401(k) savings program.

Whole Foods Market has an employee discount; while all employees are provided a standard base discount rate of 20% on all store purchases.

=== Company structure ===
Whole Foods Market is composed of seventeen companies, each specializing in a different product. In the 1990s, while new stores were being opened, other natural food chain stores were being acquired for horizontal integration. This led to the Federal Trade Commission challenging the eventual merger with Wild Oats on the basis that it violated antitrust laws, essentially eliminating competition and inflating prices in the health foods market.

=== Subsidiary companies and suppliers ===
Whole Foods Market is based on a system of decentralized buying. Each vendor is approved at the regional level for corporate standards such as being non-GMO and fair trade. Individual stores then decide which approved products to stock. They have a rolling ten-year distribution arrangement with UNFI.

== 365 by Whole Foods Market ==
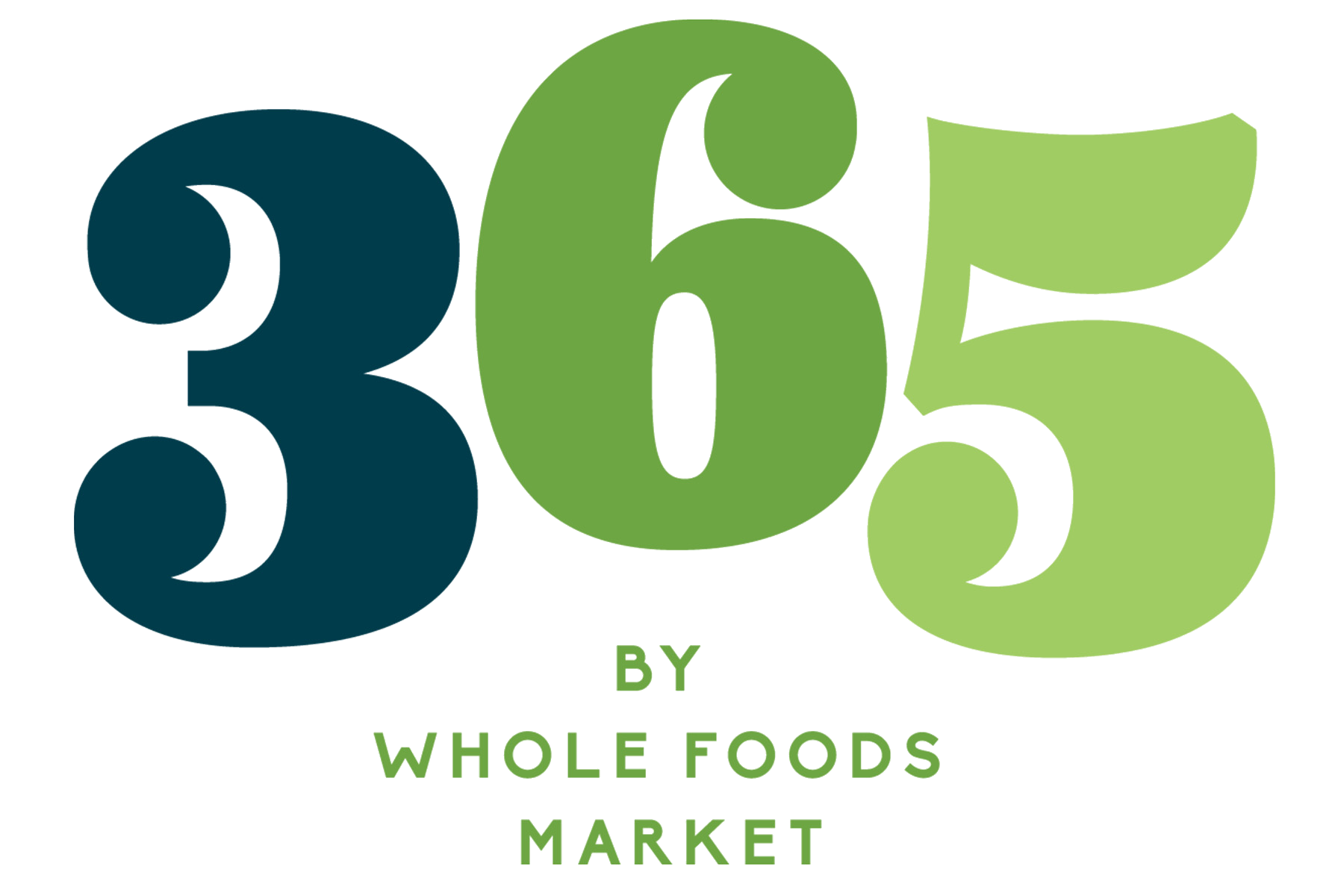
365 by Whole Foods Market logo

In June 2015, the company announced a millennial-focused and more affordable version of its regular stores, called "365 By Whole Foods Market". In addition to using digital price tags, in-store communication was done through a smartphone app. The stores had the goal of zero waste, which included donating leftover food, using LED lights, and using carbon dioxide–powered refrigeration cases. Jeff Turnas was president of the division.

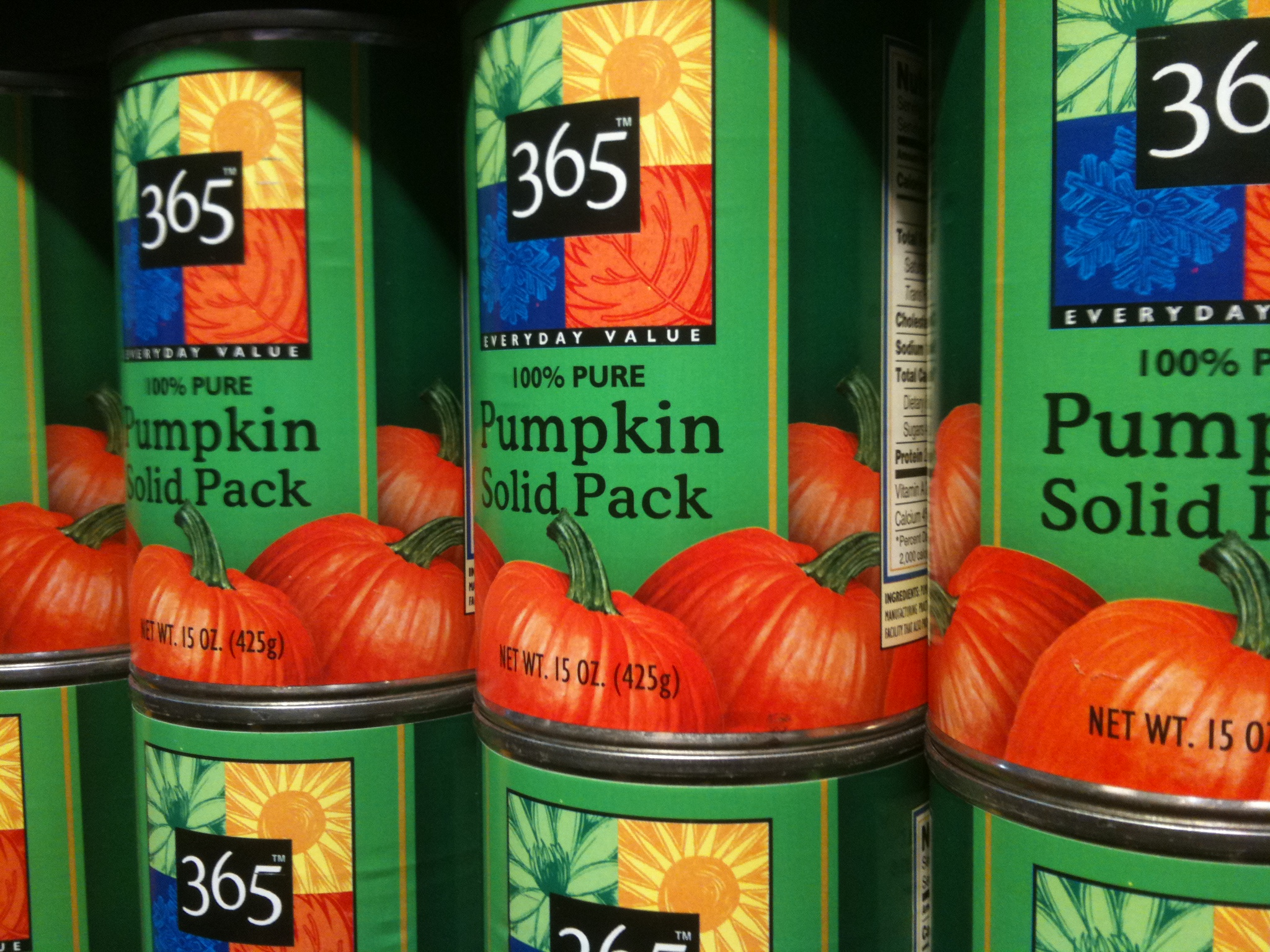
365 by Whole Foods Market private label brand

The first 365 By Whole Foods Market store opened in May 2016 in the Silver Lake neighborhood of Los Angeles. Only 12 stores had been opened by the time Amazon acquired its parent Whole Foods and growth of the chain was finally halted.

There were as many as twenty-two 365 stores under various stages of construction by early July 2017, progress at most of these construction sites came to a halt upon the news of the possible acquisition of the parent company by Amazon, and there was no information at the time if and when the construction at any of the building sites would resume.

In January 2019, it was announced that the 365 by Whole Foods Market concept would be discontinued, but the existing locations would remain open. The following month, it was announced that all existing 365 stores would be converted into regular Whole Foods stores by the end of the year.

Although the short-lived chain is long gone, the "365 by Whole Foods Market" moniker continues to be used by Whole Foods as a private label brand of low cost foods for both Whole Foods and Amazon.

== Whole Foods Market Daily Shop ==
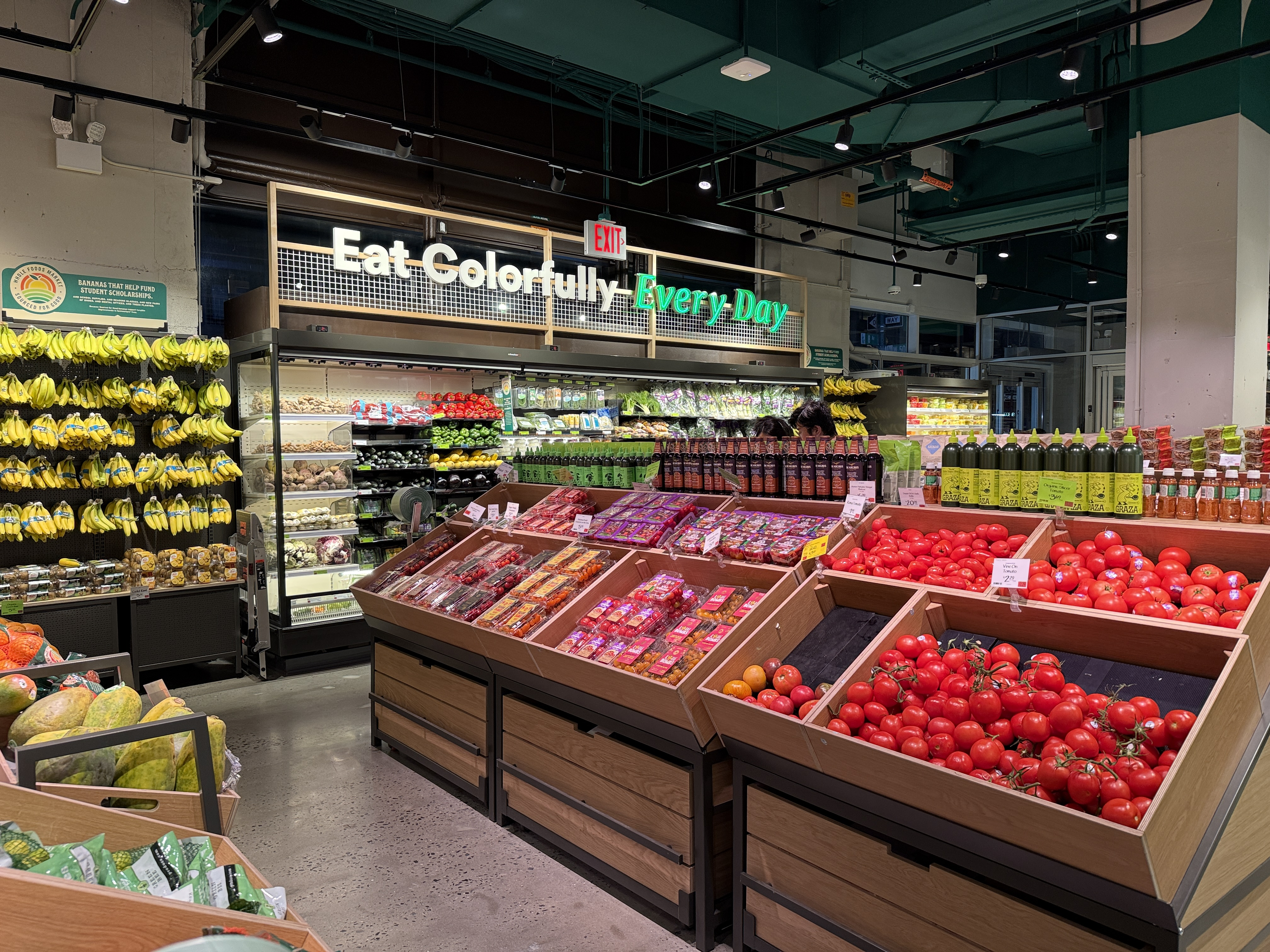
Produce section of a Whole Foods Market Daily Shop in New York City

In March 2024, Whole Foods announced the roll out of a new chain of quick-shop-format stores in Manhattan later this year that is much smaller than previous formats by being between 7,000 square feet (650 m^{2}) and 14,000 square feet (1,300 m^{2}) in size and initially selling grab-and-go snacks, prepared foods including sandwiches, weekly essentials, seasonal produce, breads, alcohol, meat and seafood, and an in-store Juice & Java. Juice & Java would offer customers made-to-order drinks, such as coffee, tea and smoothies, as well as soups, sandwiches and desserts.

The new stores are going to be located in dense metropolitan areas.

This is not the first time that Whole Foods tried a small footprint concept. In 2019, Whole Foods previously trialed a short lived convenience store concept in Chelsea that was also called "Whole Foods Market Daily Shop".

== See also ==
- Specialty foods
- Sustainable business
- "Whole Foods Parking Lot" (song)
