= Healthy Building Network =

American nonprofit organization

- Formation: 2000
- Type: NGO
- Purpose: Sustainable and green building
- Headquarters: 4911 7th Street NW, Washington, DC 20011
- Website: healthybuilding.net

The Healthy Building Network is an organization founded in 2000 which publishes and researches information on the sustainability of building materials and advocates for the use of environmentally friendly building materials and building policies. Other partner organizations which support the projects of the Healthy Building Network, including Boston Green and BuildingGreen.

The Pharos Project is one of their main projects and publishes information about the environmental impact of building materials. Pharos Project was first unveiled in 2006, and was described by an HBN representative as "a user-friendly materials evaluation tool that strives to be transparent, comprehensive, independent, accurate and fair." In 2009, the Pharos Project received an award from the United States Environmental Protection Agency (EPA). The EPA called the project "a revolutionary on-line tool for evaluating and comparing the health, environmental and social impacts of building materials in a comprehensive and transparent way."

Other projects include research and literature surveys for particular types of building materials or hazards. For example, in December 2013, the organization released a report assessing the asthmagens commonly found in building materials.

In 2024, the Healthy Building Network rebranded as Habitable.
