= Alien She (art exhibition) =

Art exhibition

Alien She was an art exhibition organized by the Miller Gallery at Carnegie Mellon with support from Vox Populi, funded by grant from the Pew Center for Arts & Heritage in Philadelphia and curated by Astria Suparak and Ceci Moss, both of whom are former Riot Grrls. Alien She was the first art exhibition to examine the impact the riot grrrl musical movement had on the artists and cultural producers of today. The exhibition's title refers to a Bikini Kill song of the same name.

== Exhibition ==
Alien She showcases seven artists' work who were inspired by the Riot Grrrl genre. The artists' projects span the last 20 year,. and included sculptures, photographs, artist books, videos, and drawings. These works offer viewers insight into the artistic diversity of the Riot Grrrl movement and demonstrate how the ideals of the movement have evolved through the works of contemporary artists today.

The exhibition's historical section was designed to reflect the "living history" of the Riot Grrrl genre. This section included posters, self-published zines and other ephemera solicited on loan from private and institutional archives. This section also includes a listening station with music representative of international Riot Grrrl bands.

The art exhibition began its nationwide tour on March 7, 2014 at Vox Populi. It then travelled to the Miller Gallery at Carnegie Mellon in 2016 and traveled to the Yerba Buena Center for the Arts; Orange County Museum of Art among other venues

== Reception ==
The exhibition was reviewed in the Journal of Modern Craft, the Los Angeles Times, and the College Art Association's caa.reviews.

== Artists ==
Most of the artists showcased in the exhibition work across multiple artistic disciplines. The artists included in the exhibition all have worked collaboratively and many of them have created platforms for other under-recognized artists and groups to connect and self-publish their works. Artists in the show included: Ginger Brooks Takahashi (Pittsburgh), Miranda July (Los Angeles), Tammy Rae Carland (Oakland), Faythe Levine (Milwaukee), L.J. Roberts (Brooklyn), Allyson Mitchell (Toronto) and Stephanie Syjuco (San Francisco).
