= The Warehouse (Syracuse) =

Former Warehouse and current University building in Syracuse, New York

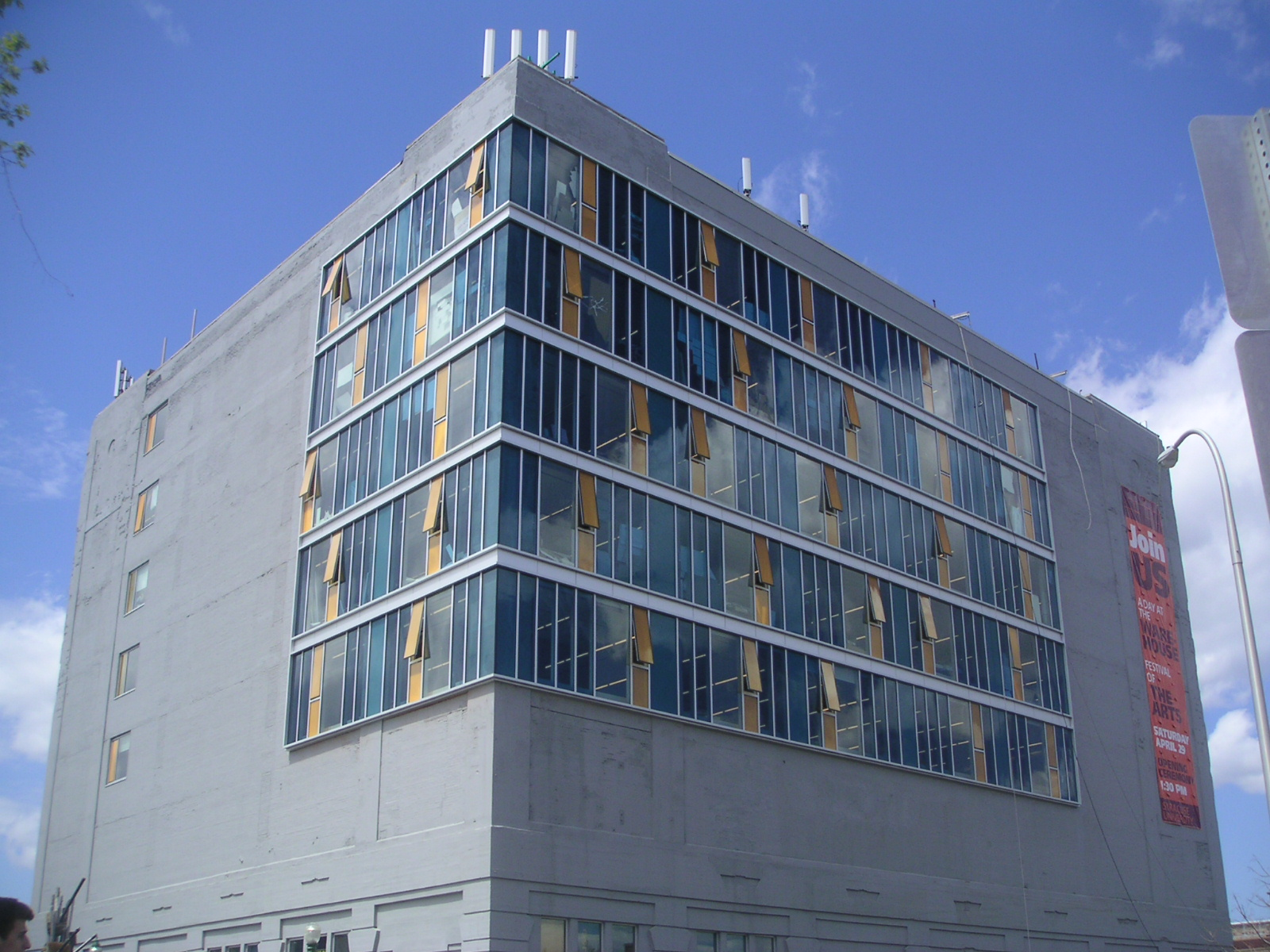
- The Warehouse upon completion in 2006.
- Interactive map of the The Warehouse area

General information
- Location: 350 West Fayette Street
- Coordinates: 43.0490644°N 76.1577143°W
- Year built: 1920s
- Renovated: 2005–06
- Cost: $13.9 million
- Owner: Syracuse University

Technical details
- Floor count: 8
- Floor area: 135,000 sq. ft.

Design and construction
- Architect: Richard Gluckman
- Architecture firm: Gluckman Mayner Architects

Website
- vpa.syr.edu/academics/design/warehouse/

The Nancy Cantor Warehouse, or simply The Warehouse, is a former storage warehouse of the Syracuse-based Dunk and Bright Furniture Company in Downtown Syracuse, New York, United States. It is owned and utilized by Syracuse University.

It is currently home to the School of Design of the College of Visual and Performing Arts. It served as the temporary home for the School of Architecture, while the on campus Slocum Hall was being renovated. In addition, the Goldring Arts Journalism Program is headquartered in the building.

== Purchase by Syracuse University ==
The Warehouse before its renovation

It was purchased in 2005 by Syracuse University, which renovated the building for classroom, gallery, and studio use at a cost of $9 million. The renovation was designed by Syracuse alumnus Richard Gluckman of New York City-based Gluckman Mayner Architects. The design firm was honored for their work on the Warehouse. In November 2013, the building was official renamed in honor of Chancellor Cantor, who was instrumental in the purchase and renovation of the building.

The Warehouse is a collaboration between Syracuse University and the Syracuse community which resulted in repurposing an underutilized building in Syracuse's historic Armory Square into an academic facility. The renovated structure provides flexible space for design studios, classrooms, and offices for the School of Design, while providing a downtown venue for public lectures, exhibitions, and galleries.

== School of Design ==
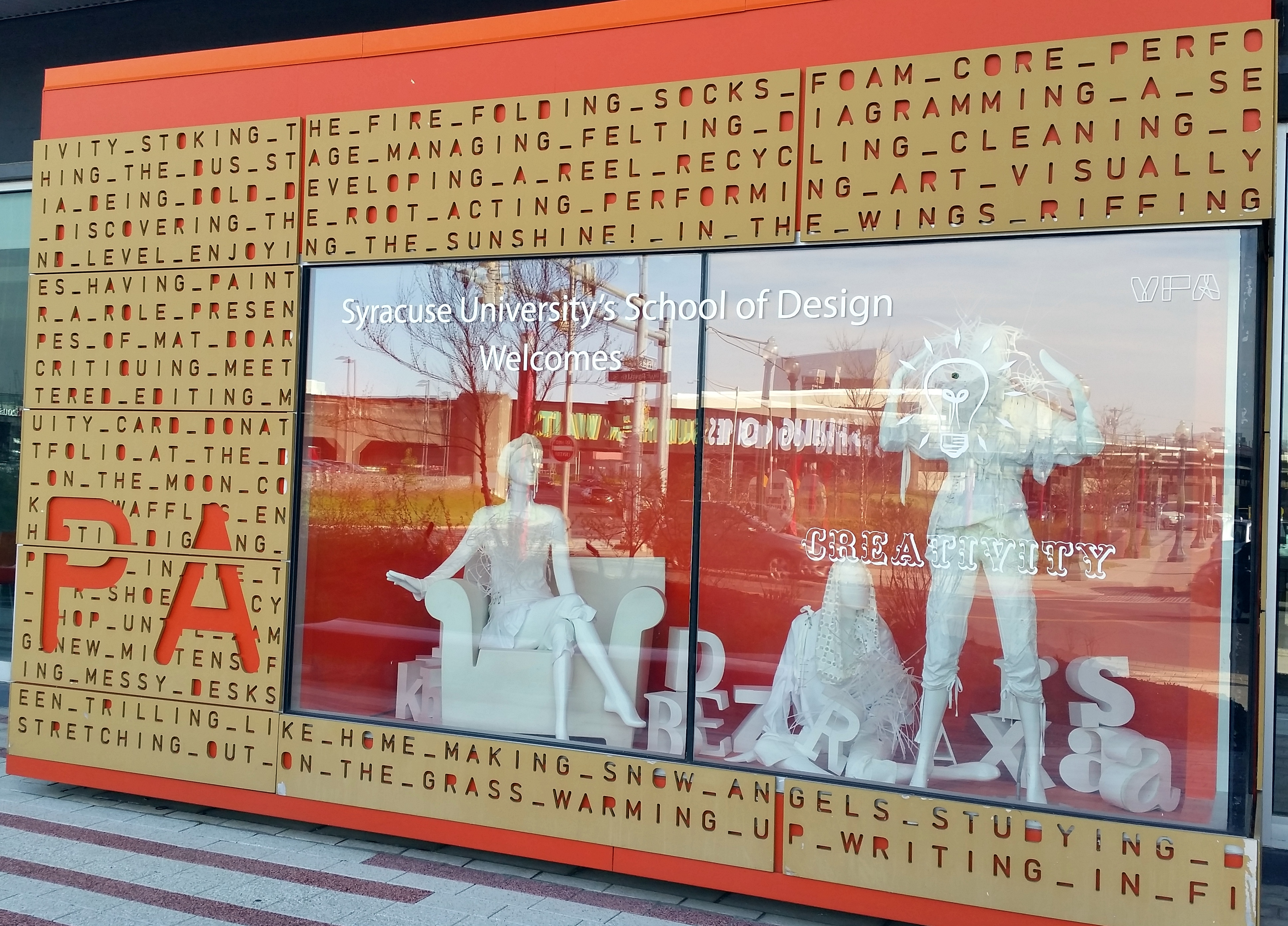
Syracuse University School of Design

The Warehouse houses the Syracuse University School of Design and the University's central marketing team. The ground floor offers a cafe, reading room, community classrooms, lecture hall, and work spaces, a community exhibition space and an international contemporary art gallery, and is the most public space in The Warehouse. The first floor is home to the School of Design administrative offices, a large lecture space, a digital fabrication lab/wood shop, and the Genet Art Gallery. The second floor are central marketing's offices. The third floor is home to the Communications Design program; the fourth floor is home to the Museum Studies program, and the Syracuse University Office of Community Engagement and Economic Development; the fifth floor is home to the Industrial + Interaction Design program; the sixth floor is home to the Environmental + Interior Design (EDI) program; and the seventh floor is home to the Fashion Design program. Part of The Warehouse's basement contains spray booths and a "dirty room" for messy projects.

== The Warehouse Gallery ==
The gallery opened on April 29, 2006 under the temporary name Bridge Gallery, with Making Frames, a slide exhibition of the Gluckman Mayner architecture firm's projects, organized by Jeffrey Hoone, Executive Director of CMAC. Elaine Quick was hired as Administrative Assistant for CMAC and was the Programs Coordinator at The Warehouse Gallery. In late June 2006, curator and artist Astria Suparak was hired as the director of the gallery, renaming it The Warehouse Gallery. The first exhibition, CMAC: Roots of Collaboration, exhibited selections from each of the CMAC member collections, opened August 2007. Artist Frank Olive was hired as Assistant Director in September 2006.

Faux Naturel, an exhibition of contemporary international work curated by Astria Suparak, ran from November 9, 2006 to January 7, 2007 at The Warehouse Gallery and toured to the Foreman Art Gallery at Bishop's University in July to August 2007. Artists included Alex Da Corte, Emily Vey Duke and Cooper Battersby, Nick Lenker, Annie MacDonell, Allyson Mitchell and Andrea Vander Kooij. The press release states, "Entropy, redemption, apocalypse, the fall from grace, the temptations of commercial culture, and the relationship between science and magic all emerge as motifs in this exhibition."

Embracing Winter, a group exhibition of knitted sculpture, psychedelic video, photography, and audio and book works by artists Janet Morton, Takeshi Murata, Bruno Munari, Collin Olan, Lisa M. Robinson and Rudy Shepherd, curated by Suparak, was on display from February 13 - March 31, 2007. It also featured interactive displays with take-home elements created by The Warehouse Gallery, a film screening titled "Winter Light" (curated by Suparak and filmmaker Brett Kashmere), and a video event by Daniel Barrow, "Winnipeg Babysitter."

Networked Nature, on exhibit from April 17, 2007 to July 17, 2007 was a group exhibition that explored the representation of “nature” through the perspective of networked culture. The exhibition included works by C5, Futurefarmers, Shih-Chieh Huang, Phil Ross, Stephen Vitiello and Gail Wight, who combined art and politics with innovative technology, such as global positioning systems (GPS), robotics and hydroponic environments. The exhibition was organized by Rhizome and Astria Suparak.

COME ON: Desire Under The Female Gaze, curated by Suparak, included artists Jo-Anne Balcaen, Juliet Jacobson, and Rachel Rampleman. The press release states, "Three young artists in Brooklyn and Montreal explicitly express desire, fantasy, disappointment, and pleasure" in videos, drawings, sculptures, and text works.

In July 2007 the Gallery was reorganized under the umbrella of the newly created SUArt Galleries at Syracuse University and Astria Suparak was dismissed as director of the Warehouse Gallery. The Gallery continued with Jeffrey Hoone as interim curator and after an international search Anja Chavez was hired as curator of contemporary art for the Warehouse Gallery and the SUArt Galleries.
