= ICA Pittsburgh =

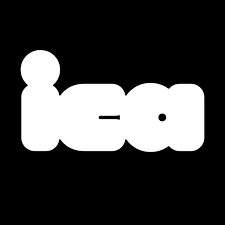
- Former names: Miller Gallery; Miller ICA
- Established: 2000
- Location: 4644 Forbes Avenue; Carnegie Mellon University; Pittsburgh, Pennsylvania, US
- Coordinates: 40.4444°N 79.9484°W
- Type: Contemporary art gallery
- Founder: Regina Gouger Miller
- Director: Elizabeth Chodos
- Website: ica.cmu.edu

The Institute for Contemporary Art (ICA) Pittsburgh is the contemporary art gallery of Carnegie Mellon University in Pittsburgh, Pennsylvania. Announced as an evolution of the Miller Institute for Contemporary Art (ICA), which closed to the public in the spring of 2024, it will be housed in the Richard King Mellon Hall of Sciences, which is under construction as of 2026. It will open to the public in the fall of 2027.

== Description ==
The plan to move the ICA to its new location was first announced in 2022, while its new name was announced the next year. The space available to the ICA will more than double in its new location at the intersection of Forbes Avenue and Craig Street, where it will neighbor the Carnegie Museum of Natural History and the Carnegie Museum of Art. It will feature four gallery spaces used for hosting exhibitions, live programs, and collaborations with artists, curators, educators, and students. The Carnegie Mellon School of Art's annual Senior Exhibition will be presented at the ICA alongside other projects.

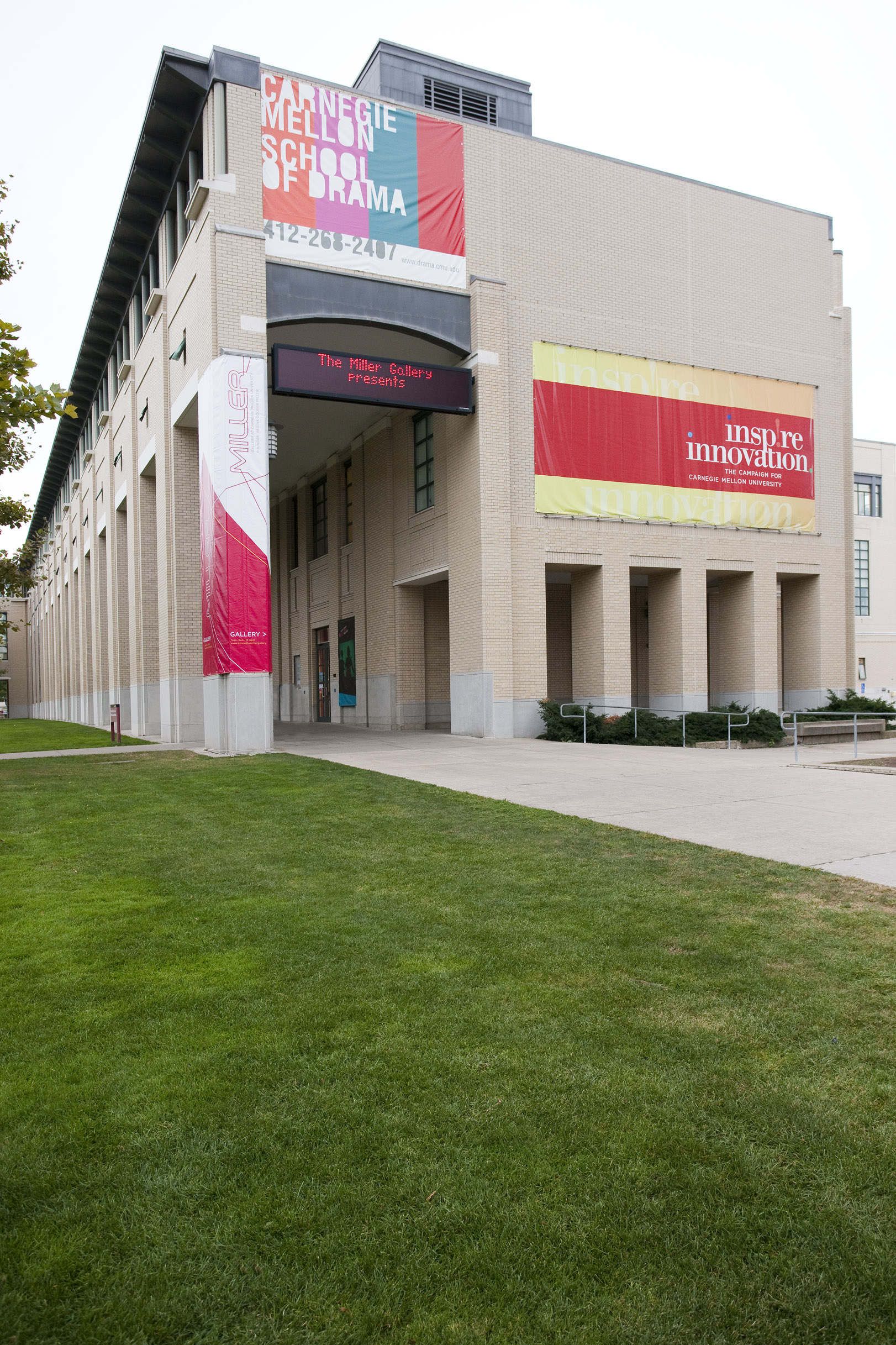
The Miller Gallery in 2009

== History ==
Originally known as the Miller Gallery, the exhibition space was founded in 2000 by Regina Gouger Miller, who is an artist, educator, businesswoman, arts patron, and alumna of the Carnegie Mellon School of Art. Petra Fallaux, the director of the existing Hewlett Gallery, inaugurated the space. In 2002, Jenny Strayer was hired as director and served until 2007. Astria Suparak served as director and curator of the gallery from 2008 until 2014, when the College terminated the position of director/curator and changed the mission of the gallery. In 2018, the Miller Gallery relaunched as the Miller ICA under the leadership of a new director, Elizabeth Chodos.

The Miller ICA produced exhibitions, projects, events, and publications with a focus on social issues, and was supported by the Carnegie Mellon College of Fine Arts. Its gallery was housed in a 9,000-square-foot (840 m^{2}) space located in the Purnell Center for the Arts on the university campus at 5000 Forbes Avenue, at the border between the Oakland and Squirrel Hill neighborhoods. Exhibitions were free and open to the public.

As the Miller ICA, the institute exhibited work by Francis Alÿs, Laylah Ali, Janine Antoni, The Art Guys, Bernd and Hilla Becher, Michael Bevilacqua, Tammy Rae Carland, The Center for Land Use Interpretation (CLUI), Center for PostNatural History, Catherine Chalmers, Michael Ray Charles, Mel Chin, Julia Christensen, Minerva Cuevas, Nicole Eisenman, Inka Essenhigh, Karen Finley, Rachel Harrison, Todd Haynes, Arturo Herrera, Miranda July, Justseeds, Tran T. Kim-Trang, Glenn Ligon, Machine Project, Kerry James Marshall, Gordon Matta-Clark, Larry Miller, Allyson Mitchell, Takashi Murakami, Yoshitomo Nara, Shirin Neshat, OMA (Office for Metropolitan Architecture), Open_Sailing, Raqs Media Collective, Philip Ross, Christy Rupp, Trevor Paglen, Ester Partegas, SANAA, David Shrigley, Al Souza, Michelle Stitzlein, subRosa, Stephanie Syjuco, Sarah Sze, Terreform ONE, TermiteTV, Fred Tomaselli, Kara Walker, Olav Westphalen, Gail Wight, Sue Williams, The Yes Men, and many others.

Notable Carnegie Mellon College of Fine Arts alumni who exhibited at the institute include Dara Birnbaum, Mel Bochner, Jacob Ciocci (Paper Rad), Peter Coffin (artist), John Currin, Cassandra C. Jones, Joyce Kozloff, Eileen Maxson, Shana Moulton, Rich Pell (Institute for Applied Autonomy, Center for PostNatural History), Blithe Riley, Fereshteh Toosi, Paul Vanouse, and Andy Warhol.

== Related links ==
- The Huffington Post: First Riot Grrrl Exhibition Explores The Lasting Impact Of The Punk Feminist Movement
- Pittsburgh Post-Gazette: Director of CMU gallery charts challenging course
- The Miller Gallery's internationally renowned new curator, Astria Suparak, debuts her first Pittsburgh show. Pittsburgh City Paper
- Rhizome: Interview with Astria Suparak
- "Art and Science Get Intimate", Art Review, Hyperallergic (April 16, 2012)
