= Craft Lake City =

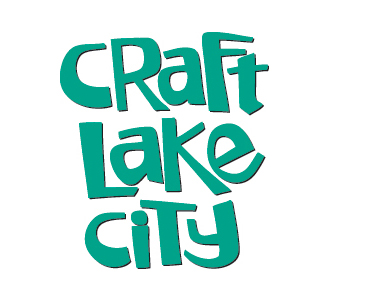
- Founded: 2009
- Founder: Angela H. Brown
- Headquarters: Salt Lake City, Utah
- Website: http://www.craftlakecity.com

Craft Lake City is a nonprofit organization that produces an annual outdoor alternative arts festival in Salt Lake City, Utah. Held the second weekend in August, the festival features do it yourself (DIY) items like silk-screened posters, reconstructed clothing, knitted items, and jewellery, along with live entertainment that includes craft demonstrations, street performers, musical acts, and local food vendors. Craft Lake City received their nonprofit 501(c)(3) status in 2011.

== History and concept ==
Concept

Craft Lake City was started in 2009 by Angela H. Brown, editor and publisher of SLUG Magazine, as a way to showcase local DIY culture. Brown was inspired by craft festivals she had attended in larger cities such as The Renegade Craft Fair and Bazaar Bizarre. She believed a similar event would fit well with Utah's crafting history and cultural background.

History

The first Craft Lake City festival was held in Salt Lake City at the Gallivan Center on August 8, 2009. It featured over 65 crafters and artists along with live entertainment provided by local Salt Lake bands including; the Coyote Hoods, Mad Max and the Wild Ones, Aye Aye, Casey James Prestwood & The Burning Angels, Cub Country, Subrosa, the Tiny Lights and Mammoth. There were over 3,000 attendees. The festival was also awarded an "Arty" by the staff of Salt Lake City Weekly for "Best DIY Arts Fair" in 2009.

The second annual Craft Lake City was held August 14, 2010, again at the Gallivan Center. This time, 130 artists were selected to participate and over 7,000 people attended. Musical performers included Salt Lake locals Joshua Payne Orchestra, the Boomsticks, Red Bennies, Hello Amsterdam, Mad Max and the Wild Ones, Spell Talk and Muscle Hawk. That year also featured a belly dance showcase with the Hathor Dance Collective, Trisha McBride and Blue Lotus dance troupe performing. The festival partnered with the Salt Lake Film Festival to continue festivities a second day, August 15, with a screening of Faythe Levine’s film “Handmade Nation” followed by a question and answer session with some Craft Lake City artists.

In 2011, Craft Lake City festivities began with an exhibit at the Utah Art Alliance's Main Street Gallery in Salt Lake City called “Art vs. Craft.” The show ran July 5 through July 30 and featured the work of fourteen Craft Lake City artists. The festival expanded to over 180 vendors, once again held at the Gallivan Center on August 13 with about 12,000 attendees. This year, the festival set up two stages for musical performances, which included a variety of local bands: The Mooks, the 3 2 1's, Muscle Hawk, It Foot It Ears, Subrosa, S.L.F.M., Dances With Wolves, Dark Seas, Kenshin Taiko, Birthquake!, Joshua Payne Orchestra, Ann-Britt Kennedy, No Nation Orchestra, Rifamos, Mad Max and the Wild Ones, Max Pain and the Groovies and Spell Talk. More entertainment was provided with a belly dance showcase by Blue Lotus, Hathor and the Lunar Collective, as well as ongoing breakdancing routines by Ensoul Collaboration.

Workshop series

In order to expand the impact of the region, the Craft Lake City Artist Workshop Series was introduced December 12, 2011. Initially created in partnership with West Elm, a home decor retailer which is a holding of Williams-Sonoma, Inc. (WSI), the monthly workshops now take place in a variety of locations including the Valley Fair Shopping Mall in West Valley City, Alibi Bar & Place in Salt Lake City and at Craft Lake City headquarters. These workshops are led by local artists and makers and prior festival exhibitors who conduct a two-hour craft project.
