= Eleanore Ramsey =

American designer bookbinder

Eleanore Edwards Ramsey is an American designer bookbinder based in San Francisco, California.

== Biography ==
Eleanore Ramsey's discovery of her passion for design bookbinding was serendipitous, and started in the late 1960s, when she was a recent college graduate and came across a catalog of fine book bindings, while working for a rare book dealer near Chicago. Her studies in American and English design bookbinding began with Dr. Harry Green in 1975 through 1976; she continued her studies in the area of fine binding with Barbara Hiller (who she considers the dominant influence on her work) from 1975 to 1980.

Her work has been exhibited widely, with significant exhibitions at the San Francisco Museum of Modern Art, Bibliothèque Forney in Paris, the Guild of Bookworkers, Stanford University, Bridwell Library, and the Tregaskis Centenary Exhibition. More recently, her work was featured on the traveling exhibition of fine bindings "Drop Dead Gorgeous: Fine Bindings of La Prose du Transsibérien Re-creation" that debuted at the San Francisco Center for the Book in 2019 and then traveled from Los Angeles and Boston to London. Her work has also been featured on compendia of the works of the best contemporary artists of the book, such as Christian Galantaris's De la Création en Reliure (Paris, 2012).

In 1992, Eleanore Ramsey won the Stanford University Libraries' "Hand Bookbinding Today: An International Competition and Exhibition in Memory of Leah Wollenberg" for her Ukiyo-E: The Floating World tight-back binding sewn on recessed cords, covered in morocco, oasis and box calf leathers, with a "floating" cloud pattern laser cut into the boards; openings between the clouds allowed the flyleaves of antique ukiyo-e Japanese silk to be visible through the covers.

Other notable awards include Helen Ward DeGolyer Triennial Exhibition and Award for American Bookbinding (1997, Award for Design 2003, Award for Excellence in Fine Binding 2012), the Book Club of California's Oscar Lewis Award for outstanding contribution in the field of book arts (2004), and recognition from the San Francisco Center for the Book as one of "Five Treasures" for extraordinary dedication and innovation in Book Arts (2009). In 2018, Eleanore Ramsey was elected a Brother of the Art Workers' Guild, proposed by preeminent UK bookbinder Bernard Middleton.

With her husband, Andrew T. Nadell, she also maintains a collection of nineteenth-century Gothic Revival.
