= Vox Populi (art gallery) =

Philadelphia art gallery

Vox Populi is a nonprofit art gallery and collective in Philadelphia, Pennsylvania. Founded in 1988, it presents experimental art and ideas via monthly shows, performances, and gallery talks. Located on North 11th Street, it is the longest running artist collective in the city.

Among the artists whose work the space has hosted include Kembra Pfahler, Paul Thek, Alvin Baltrop, Taisha Paggett, Adam Pendleton, Cecilia Dougherty, Guy Ben-Ari, Virgil Marti and Brainstormers member Maria Dumlao. Musical performers at their old location on Cherry Street included Gang Gang Dance, Comets on Fire, CocoRosie, Growing, Wolf Eyes and many others.

== History ==
In 2011, under the Executive Directorship of Andrew Suggs, Vox Populi opened a 1,000-square-foot black box performance space, AUX, which highlights interdisciplinary time-based art with sound art, film screenings, performance, dance, and experimental theater as well as hosting classes, workshops, and other events. AUX has hosted programs with performers and media artists such as Dynasty Handbag, Jacolby Satterwhite, C.A. Conrad, Angela Washko, Ann Hirsch, and Miguel Gutiérrez among others.

Vox is also home to Fourth Wall, a dedicated video lounge which the collective invites outside curators to program for 2 to 3 months at a time. Fourth Wall was founded as an independent gallery within the space called "Screening" in 2007 by collaborative video artists and former members Matthew Suib and Nadia Hironaka.

In 2010, Vox Populi was invited to participate in "No Soul For Sale" at the Tate Modern, a festival of 70 international independent non-commercial art spaces, held in the Turbine Hall as part of the museum's 10th anniversary celebrations. Four years later, Vox Populi hosted the show "Alien She," the first exhibition to examine the lasting impact of Riot Grrrl on artists and cultural producers working now co-curated by Astria Suparak and Ceci Moss.

== Funding ==
The galley's programming is made possible in part by funding from The Pew Center for Arts & Heritage among other charitable foundations and private individuals.

== See also ==
- Chad States
