= Logos Foundation =

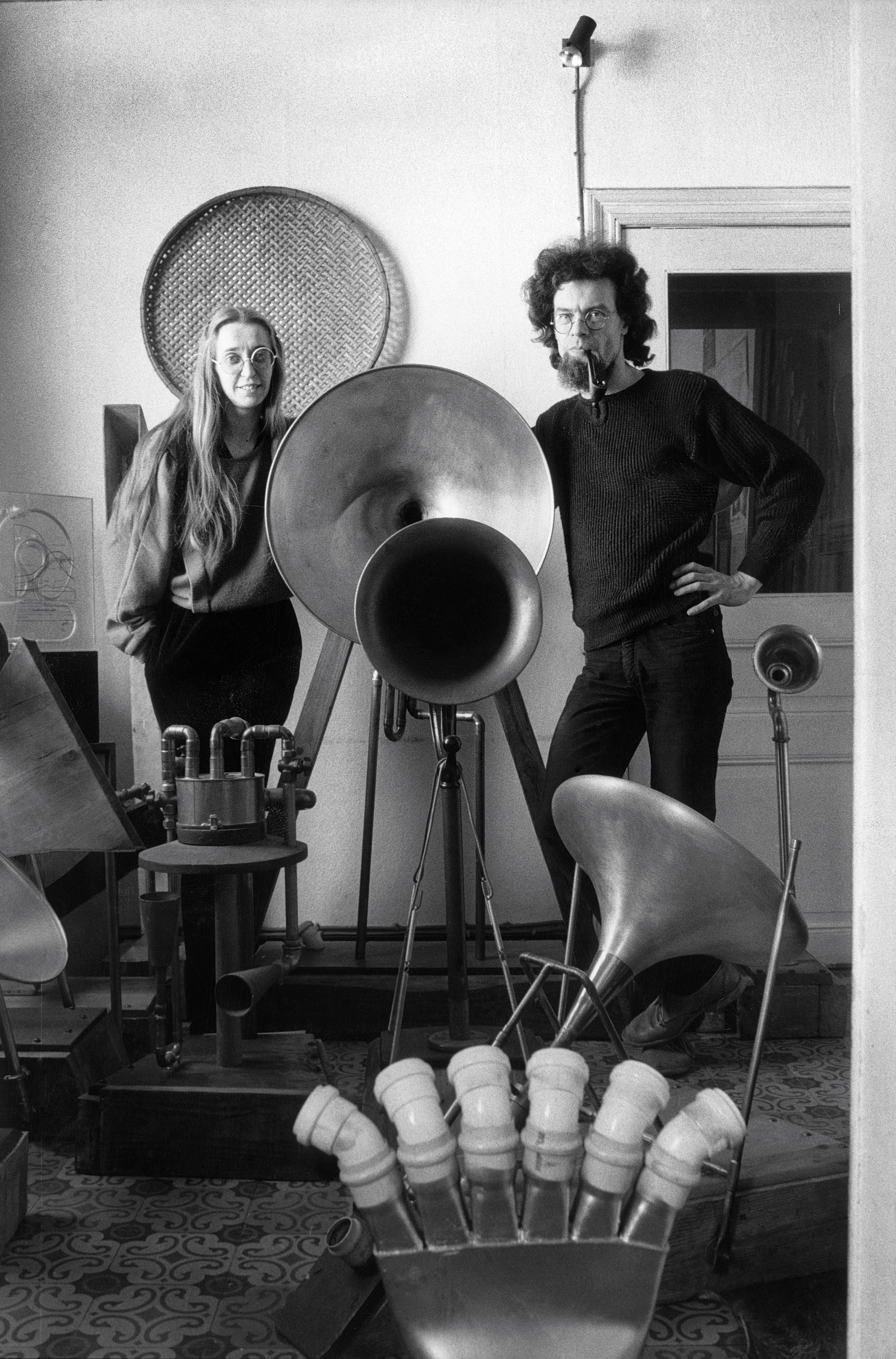
Moniek Darge and Godfried-Willem Raes, Logos Foundation, 1983

The Logos Foundation is a professional artistic organisation founded in 1968. It focuses on the promotion of new musics and audio related arts by means of new music production, concerts, performances, composition, technological research projects and other contemporary music related activities.

The Logos Foundation (and its concert hall, the Logos Tetrahedron) is based in Ghent, Belgium (Flanders region).

Composers Godfried-Willem Raes and Moniek Darge are the major driving forces behind the Logos Foundation.

Since the last decades of the 20th century the Logos Foundation encourages publication of music in a copyright-free format.

== Logos Tetrahedron ==
The Logos Tetrahedron is a concert hall in Ghent, Belgium adjacent to the foundation's recording studio and offices. It has seating for 150 people and is equipped with sound and light infrastructure. Since the concert hall is in the shape of a tetrahedron, it has no straight angles and, as a result, no standing waves can occur. Acoustic waves can never amplify one another in phase and are reflected by the walls under ever changing angles.

The hall is exclusively used for contemporary and experimental music, such as electronic music and computer music and holds approximately 65 concerts a year, primarily by the Logos Foundation. In 2012 they were host for the ISCM World Music Days .

The concert hall was built in 1990 by Godfried-Willem Raes and the Logos workgroup using steel, concrete and plate-metal. Construction took one year. The hall was opened in 1991 with a three-day festival.

== M&M robot orchestra ==
Logos houses the innovative music ensemble M&M robot orchestra (man and machine). All kinds of musical interfaces (wireless gesture control, real time sound analysis, microwave radar, acceleration sensors, pyrodetectors, lightsensors, myoelectric devices, brainwaves, EEG and ECG and so on) are combined with the results of experimental robot design. Collaborative concerts are organised involving interactive robots and musicians. They made a manual for composers who would like to write for this orchestra.

In 2021, the Stedelijk Museum voor Actuele Kunst in Ghent dedicated an exhibition to the Logos Foundation and its robot orchestra.

== See also ==
- Schreck ensemble
