= Gerrit V. Sinclair =

American artist

Gerrit Sinclair
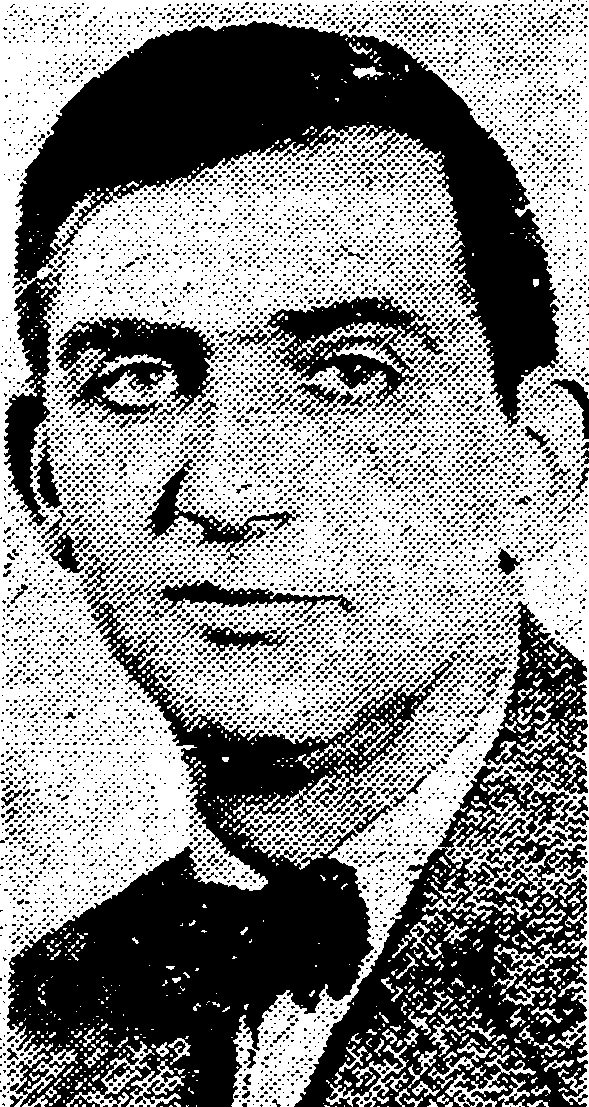
- Sinclair in 1929, from a Milwaukee Journal illustration
- Born: May 1, 1890; Grand Haven, Michigan
- Died: December 23, 1955 (aged 65); Milwaukee, Wisconsin
- Education: School of the Art Institute of Chicago
- Style: Regionalism, Realism

Gerrit Sinclair (May 1, 1890 – December 23, 1955) was an American painter, printmaker, and art instructor based in Milwaukee, Wisconsin. Throughout his career, he primarily worked in a Regionalist style, focusing on rural scenes of southeastern Wisconsin and chronicling the evolution of Milwaukee's urban fabric.

== Biography ==
Gerrit Van Westrienen Sinclair was born on May 1, 1890, in Grand Haven, Michigan. His father, Peter Sinclair (1842–1916), emigrated from Scotland in 1870 and worked as a shipwright, while his mother, Ryntje Van Westrienen (1861–1940), was born to Dutch immigrants in South Haven, Michigan. The family relocated to Chicago in 1896, where Gerrit Sinclair eventually enrolled in the School of the Art Institute in 1910, graduating five years later. Following the United States' entry into WWI in 1917, he enlisted in the US Army Ambulance Service and was stationed in Veneto, Italy.

In 1920, following his return to the US, Sinclair was hired by Milwaukee educators Miriam Frink and Charlotte Partridge to be the first instructor at the newly created Layton School of Art, located in the basement of the Layton Art Gallery, the city's first public museum. He would teach at the school for three decades without interruption, except for a year spent working in Paris, France, in 1929 and 1930, where he showed some of his works at the Salon d'Automne.

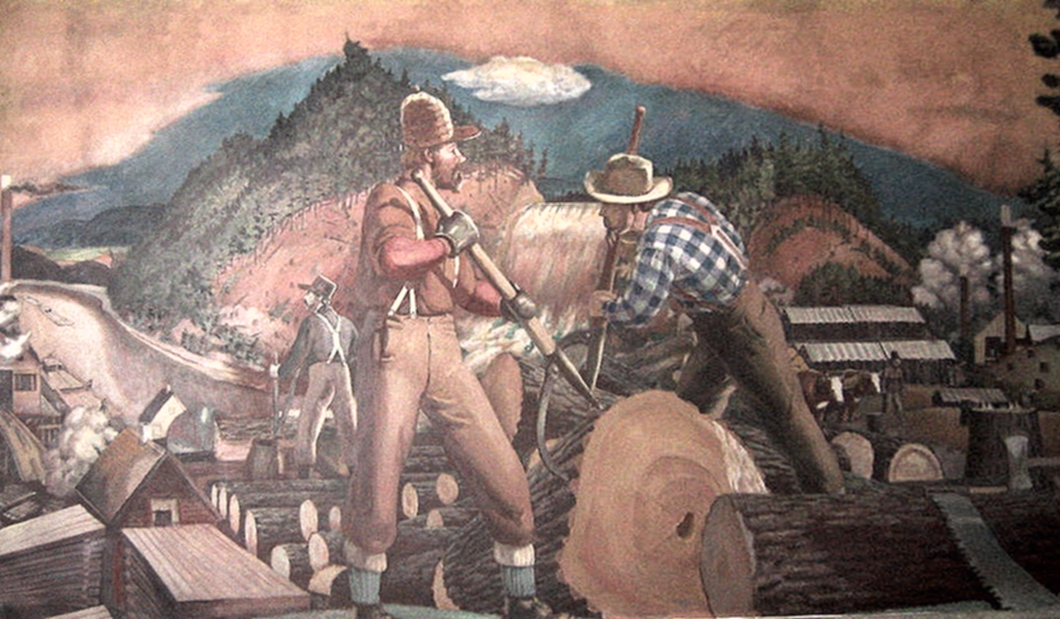
Lumbering (1940), one of the WPA murals completed by Sinclair in Wausau.

During the 1930s, Sinclair won several commissions from the government-sponsored Federal Art Project of the Works Progress Administration, including for the US Post Office and Court House of Wausau, in north-central Wisconsin. During that time, he also painted a number of scenes of everyday life in Milwaukee, as well as views of rural landscapes of surrounding counties. One such painting, titled Spring in Wisconsin, was included in the 1939 New York World's Fair.

In the late 1940s, Sinclair frequently taught at the Ox-Bow School of Art and Artists Residency in Saugatuck, Michigan. He retired from teaching altogether in 1954, as both Miriam Frink and Charlotte Partridge were forced to resign from the Layton School of Art. He died the following year at the age of sixty-five.

== Museum collections ==
Sinclair's work is represented in the collections of the Milwaukee Art Museum, Museum of Wisconsin Art, Brooklyn Museum, Flint Institute of Arts, and Cedarburg Art Museum.

== Bibliography ==
- Hall, Michael D. (2008). Gerrit V. Sinclair (1890-1955). Chicago: Richard Norton Gallery.
