= Schreck Ensemble =

The Schreck Ensemble is a Dutch new music ensemble specializing in electroacoustic music, established in 1989. The name is a combination of the surnames of the founders – composers Arie van Schutterhoef and Hans van Eck – a reference to the actor Max Schreck. They also program their own software with the SuperCollider programming language, and develop their own hardware for the production and performance of electroacoustic music.

The Schreck Ensemble has commissioned electroacoustic compositions by Arthur Sauer, Gene Carl, Gerda Geertens, Jeremy Arden, Michael Chocholak, and Makoto Shinohara, and has performed works by Kaija Saariaho, John Cage, Jean-Claude Risset and Chiel Meyering. The ensemble also performs multimedia works. Aquae Supracoelestes for tape and video-projection and Nuctemeron for ensemble, tape, and video-projection are two examples.

== Software ==
Schreck develops software that can create sounds that do not exist in nature and modify those that do. It is also used to emulate sounds generated by obsolete electronic equipment.

Their software also attempts to expand the relationship between acoustic instruments and the computer. An example of this is a score-following program called ComParser. The program determines which part of the music is being played and initiates pre-programmed sequences of sound processors at the appropriate times. ComParser follows the tempo of the musician. ComParser is not a pitch-follower, but a spectrum-follower.

== Instruments ==
Three instruments have been designed by the Schreck-Ensemble: the Stratifier, the BassBox, and the Pulsor.

=== The Stratifier ===
The Stratifier is a small instrument (10 x 30 x 40 cm) with twelve touch sensitive control-surfaces that send signals to sound processing equipment.

=== The BassBox ===
The BassBox is an acoustic instrument. The sound of this instrument is created by the overblowing of two flutes that obtain their air from a large fast-moving bass speaker. The sound does not resemble the sound of a flute but that of a wooden percussion instrument with many overtones. The instrument can be heard in the composition "The Day".

=== The Pulsor ===
The Pulsor is under development. The Pulsor makes it possible to play the BassBox live allowing greater manipulation of the bass speaker than with the prerecorded sounds. The Pulsor also enables the BassBox to be played with the Stratifier.

== Collaborations ==
The Schreck Ensemble has collaborated with many institutes and organizations inside and outside of the Netherlands including the European Network (Foundation Gaudeamus/Associazone Nuove Sincronie in Milan, Italy); studios for electronic music STEIM and CEM in Amsterdam; The Netherlands; tART (technology and art) -organization of the University Twente in Enschede, the Netherlands; Danish Institute for Electro-acoustic Music (DIEM) at Aarhus, Denmark, and the Centro Ricerche Musicali in Rome.

Their repertoire includes a song called The Day, which is a collaboration between the Schreck Ensemble and the sound artist Hans van Koolwijk featuring his instrument, the Bambuso Sonore.

== Appearances ==
The Schreck Ensemble performed for the first time in 1989 at the then-renowned art center Apollohuis in Eindhoven. Since that time, the Ensemble has performed in major venues for contemporary music in the Netherlands and abroad, including the Music Centre Vredenburg. Utrecht; the Grote Kerk, Groningen; Dodorama, Rotterdam; the Ruïne Kerk, Bergen, North Holland; Theater Frascati, Amsterdam; Music Centre Frits Philips, Eindhoven; Theatre Kikker, Utrecht; Theatre Provadja, Alkmaar; the Music Centre, IJsbreker, Amsterdam; the Stedelijk Museum for Modern Art. Amsterdam; and the Music Centre, 's-Hertogenbosch.

=== Festivals ===
The Schreck Ensemble has played at several festivals including:

- November Music Festival in Den Bosch and Gent
- Distronics Festival in Eindhoven
- Sounds Imagined, Images Sonified near Castle Eijsden at Limburg
- Touch Festival Amsterdam organized by STEIM.

Abroad, the ensemble was invited to be the ensemble-in-residence during the Studienwoche fr Neue Musik in Lneburg, Germany to which it later returned to appear in the Festival für Neue Musik. Schreck also played at the MIX01 Festival in Aarhus, Denmark; at the Festival 'Musica Scienza, Teatro dell' Ascolto' in Rome, Italy; on invitation of the cultural board of the regional government of Andaluca. Schreck participated in the Contemporary Music Concert Series in Theatro Central in Sevilla; and in the XIV Contemporary Music Days in Teatro Alhambra in Granada, Spain.

=== Abroad ===
Other countries where the Schreck Ensemble has appeared include:

- Germany, particularly in Essen (Kunsthaus Essen) and Lüneburg (Glockenhaus)
- Spain at the Granada Teatro Alhambra and the Sevilla Teatro Central
- Italy at the Goethe-Institute and the Sassari Teatro Il Ferroviario
- Belgium at the Logos Tetrahedron (Ghent)
- Denmark at the Aarhus Musikhuset.

=== Radio ===
Radio broadcasts of the Schreck Ensemble have been broadcast by the Dutch stations KRO, the VPRO, and the ConcertZender. Outside the Netherlands there were similar programs in Australia (Difficult Listening), Russia, and Denmark.

=== Videoworks ===
The video-work made by Schreck was shown during the 7th International Festival of New Film, Split-Croatia in the new media section; at the Sas International Award 2003 festival in Catania, Italy - organized by the United Nations - in the category Digital Wave for experimental movies and video-art; and selected for the Slowtime? .... Quicktime as an artistic medium as an example for streaming media. This appearance was organized by Agricola de Cologne experimental platform for Internet art.
