= Brainstormers =

American artists

- Known for: Performance art, art criticism, video art
- Movement: Feminist art movement

The Brainstormers are a group of young American women artists whose performances mostly address gender inequity in the US art world. Consisting of fellow Hunter MFA graduates Danielle Mysliwiec, Elaine Kaufmann and Maria Dumlao, their most well-known work is one where they stood in costume, at the entrance of P.S.1 during the Greater New York show in 2005, pointing accusingly at the institution for its gender discrimination in its selection of artists.

== Work ==
=== Point, 2005 ===
In 2005, fellow Hunter Master of Fine Arts graduates, Mysliwiec, Kaufmann, Dumlao, Anne Polashenski, Jane Johnston and four volunteers, stood outside P.S.1's entrance in a colorful curly wigs, their faces painted, pointing directly at the institution, for six hours. Point was a performance that called attention to the New York City exhibition's roster of artists being over two-thirds male at a time when the numbers of women in art programs exceeded that of men. The group drew on the earlier feminist art protest work of the Guerrilla Girls, with whom they have collaborated. Polashenski and Johnston (the latter a co-founder of the group with Mysliwiec, Kaufmann and Dumlao) have since left the group.

=== Other work ===
In 2005, the Brainstormers performed again, in a piece entitled How Good Are You? outside the entrance to the Armory Show, dressed in lab coats, handing out color-coded research about the levels of representation of women artists in Chelsea art galleries. The following year, Dumlao, Kaufmann, Mysliwiec and Polashenski published a researched piece entitled "The Cutting Edge and the Corporate Agenda" in the international journal Women & Environments, for its women, art and community activism issue.

In 2008, the group did a collaborative work with the Guerrilla Girls at the Bronx Museum of Art. Kaufmann told Art News, "I think what is really important was that we were ... coming after the Guerrilla Girls, and we were still seeing the same kind of gender discrimination happening in our generation and felt compelled to do something."

Also in 2008, the group stationed themselves at the corner of West 24th Street and 10th Avenue in Chelsea, and had passers-by fill in mad libs-style postcards protesting about the lack of female representation in art galleries. In 2009, they exhibited at the Lesbian, Gay, Bisexual & Transgender Community Center in New York City.

=== Philosophy and techniques ===
The Brainstormers use similar tactics to the Guerrilla Girls, such as agitprop theatre and shocking statistics. For the group, the fault of institutional sexism does not lie with the institutions only. In 2006, they wrote,

"The responsibility for the perpetuation of this systemic form of discrimination falls on a rich network of dealers, curators, institutions, and even artists themselves. Each party denies any responsibility for bringing about change and instead tries to benefit from the status quo, their decisions guided by the bottom line."

Of their work, Maria Dumlao has also said. "Our work and actions are meant to inform, excite and provoke people in a dialogue. We encourage them to act on their own terms."

== Members' other work ==
Dumlao is a member of the Philadelphia non-profit collective and art space Vox Populi.

Mysliwiec is an assistant studio art professor at American University and on the board of the art blog, Art Fag City.

Kaufmann has an ongoing interest in challenging the political structure of the art world and has pursued alternative venues including cable access television, activist public interventions, and the Internet.
