= San Francisco Center for the Book =

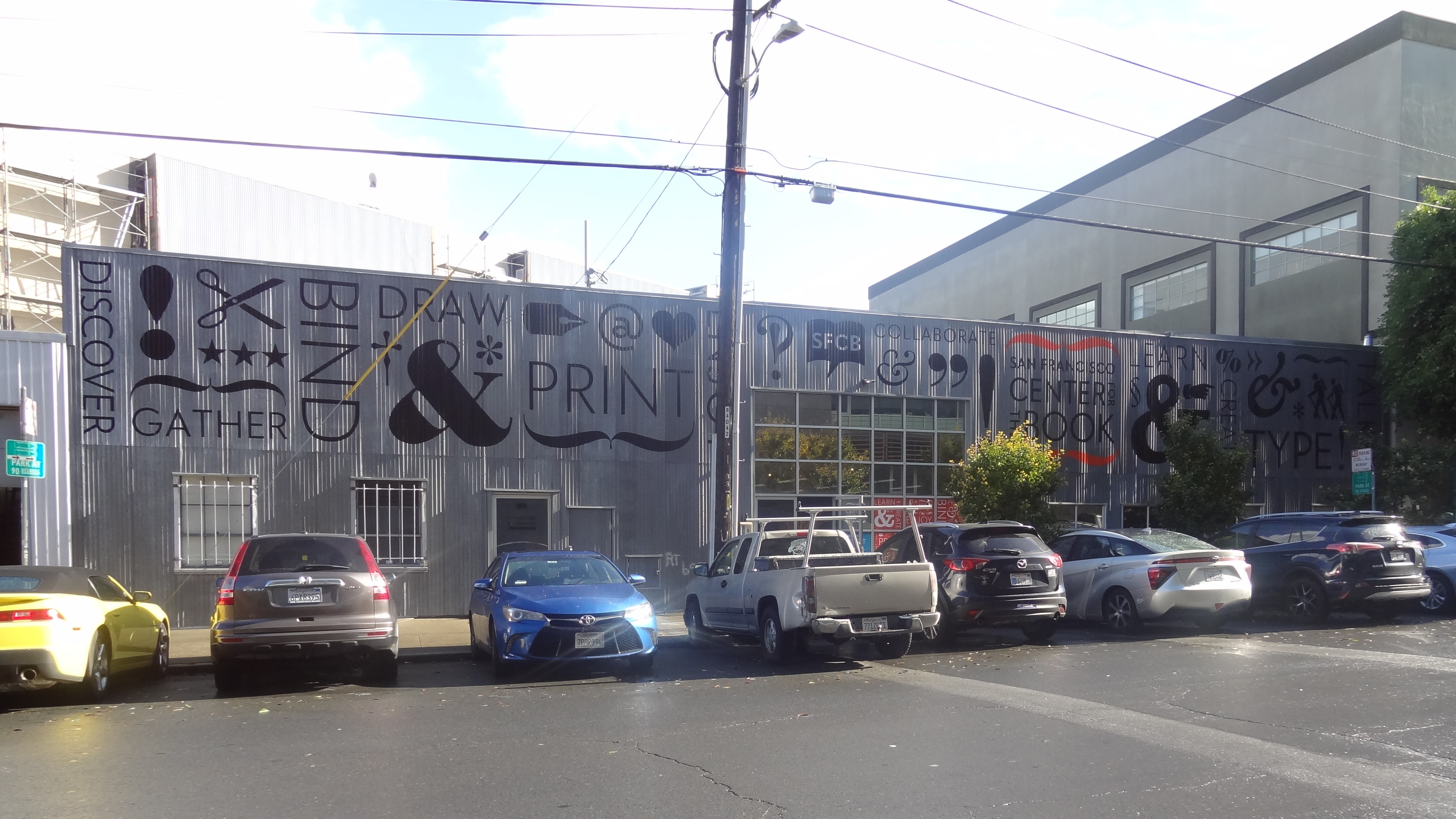
- View from Rhode Island St

Location
- 375 Rhode Island St; San Francisco, California 94103; United States
- 37°45′55.4″N 122°24′8.6″W

Information
- Type: Art school
- Established: 1996
- Founder: Mary Austin and Kathleen Burch
- Classes offered: Bookbinding, letterpress printing, artist's books, calligraphy
- Campus type: Urban
- Website: sfcb.org

The San Francisco Center for the Book (SFCB) is a non-profit organization founded in 1996 by Mary Austin and Kathleen Burch in San Francisco, California. The first center of its kind on the West Coast, SFCB was modeled after two similar organizations, The Center for Book Arts in New York City and the Minnesota Center for Book Arts in Minneapolis.

SFCB describes itself in its mission statement as "center of inspiration for the book arts world, celebrating the art & craft of letterpress printing, bookbinding, and artists bookmaking."

Currently, SFCB offers over 300 workshops and 44 free events a year. In addition to workshops and events, they have a thriving exhibition program, Small Plates program, and collaborate with many local nonprofits, museums, and libraries. They also host special visits and hands-on demonstrations for students of all ages, teachers, librarians, corporate team building, collectors, visiting printers, artists, writers, and designers.

== History ==
The San Francisco Center for the Book was co-founded by Mary Austin and Kathleen Burch, who recognized a growing need in San Francisco and the Bay Area for a facility specifically designed and equipped for the book arts. The first center of its kind on the West Coast, SFCB was incorporated in March 1996 as a 501(c)(3) non-profit organization. The grand opening on July 30, 1996, attracted an overflow crowd of more than 400 people. From their first season, with 64 students in a dozen classes, they have grown to more than 300 classes and nearly 2,000 per year. In early 2013, they moved to a 6,385-square-foot (593.2 m^{2}) space, including a large print studio, exhibition gallery, a platemaking lab, a separate bindery, and administrative offices.

== Workshops ==
SFCB offers more than 200+ workshops each year in three broad categories: printing, bookbinding, and related arts. Registration begins as soon as each trimester's workshops are announced, and continues throughout the trimester. Students are encouraged to register early, as class size is limited and workshops are filled on a first-come, first-served basis. SFCB has two Core Certificate Programs in Bookbinding and Letterpress Printing. They currently offer a range of workshop scholarship opportunities.

== Events ==
The San Francisco Center for the Book offers a wealth of public programs, many of which are free. Events create opportunities for the community to cultivate ties with professional and amateur book artists, writers and scholars; share the pleasures of letterpress printing, bookbinding, letterforms and artists' books with a broader audience; and create an exciting dialogue between makers, collectors, and connoisseurs.

Roadworks: A Steamroller Printing Festival is a day-long annual street fair hosted by SFCB showcasing printmaking and the art of the book. Using an antique steamroller, a team of artists and printers print large-scale linoleum carved block prints. In addition to the steamroller printing centerpiece, there are artists, vendors, and organizations presenting an assortment of fine and affordable wares.

== Exhibitions ==
SFCB has mounted over 100 book arts related exhibitions since its inception in 2006, ranging from group works to individual retrospectives and featuring local, national, and international book artists. The 1,400-square-foot (130 m^{2}) exhibition space is adjacent to the print and bindery studios, creating the perfect environment for visitors to see both works in progress and fully realized art work. They have also presented exhibitions at off-site venues including the Commonwealth Club, ODC/Dance at Project Artaud, San Francisco Public Library, and the Marin Community Center.

== Community ==
As a non-profit organization, SFCB has maintained an essential role in providing for the local arts community. It offers a number of volunteering opportunities year-round as well as internships. Field trips focus primarily on providing workshops for K-12 and college students, adults, and classroom teachers. They also offer half and full day corporate team building workshops. The facility serves as a venue for the activities of other book arts organizations in the Bay Area, including the Pacific Center for the Book Arts and The Hand Bookbinders of California.

== Imprint Publications ==
The Imprint of SFCB is the publishing arm of the San Francisco Center for the Book, and a home for a selected group of artists to learn the art and craft of the handmade book. The Imprint facilitates SFCB's mission of promoting the traditional book arts alongside exploration of experimental forms and techniques. Publications of the Imprint of the San Francisco Center for the Book are available for purchase.

Small Plates Edition Series Small Plates is a series of 4" square handmade artists' books issued in editions of 100 signed and numbered copies each. Released on a periodic basis, these editions feature creative interplay between word, image and book structure. Invited participants range from emerging to established artists. Small Plates book production is a collaborative process that was designed to benefit the artist, SFCB and the wider community.

Artist in Residence Program The Imprint of the SFCB's Artist in Residence Program ran from 2005 to 2012. The program provided emerging and established artists with technical and studio support to create handmade limited-edition books. Participants were chosen from a creative community of San Francisco Bay Area artists ranging from those in the fine arts and multi-media to photographers, poets and writers. The goal of the Artist in Residency was to raise awareness of book arts as a vital genre in contemporary art, to bring fresh perspectives to the field, and to support artists in their vocation. Residency artists shared their skills, processes and perspective through public lectures, workshops and by welcoming volunteer participation in the production of their editions which are printed and bound at the SFCB. The Residency hosted one artist (or artist team) per year, and concluded each December with a signed and numbered artist's book project issued in trade edition and deluxe edition versions. The artist-in-residency program was made possible through book sales, donations and artist sponsorships. Past Artists in Residence include: Michael Bartalos, Nora Pauwels and John DeMerritt, Amy Franceshini and Michael Swaine, Kota Ezawa, Gail Wight, Ala Ebtekar, and Nigel Poor.

== Facilities ==
SFCB offers daytime Studio Rental (Wednesday-Friday 10am-4pm) and evening Open Studio hours for those who qualify.
