= Godfried-Willem Raes =

Belgian composer, performer and instrument maker

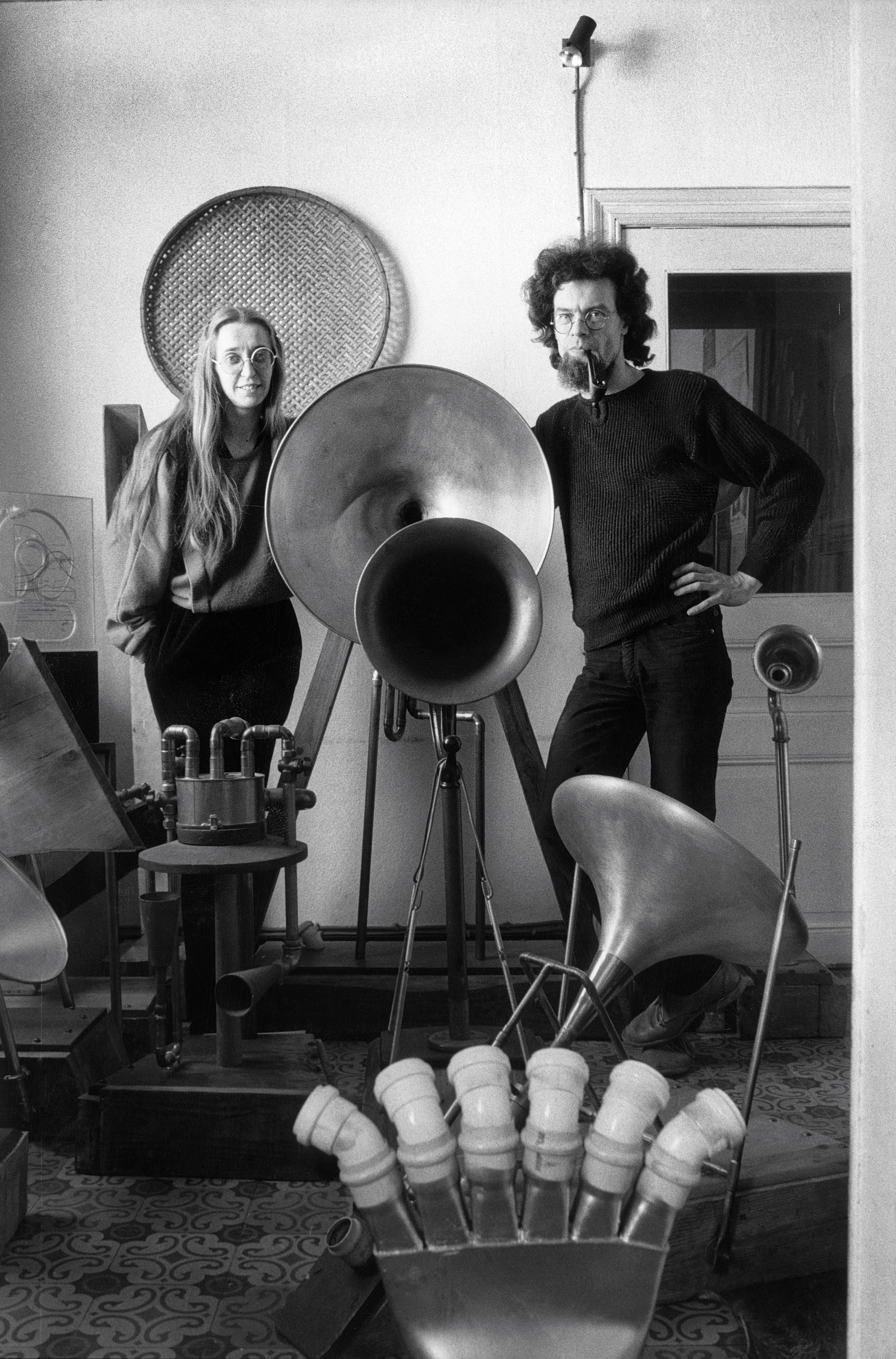
Moniek Darge & Godfried-Willem Raes (1983)

Godfried-Willem Raes is a Belgian composer, performer and instrument maker. He is the founder of the Logos Foundation of which he is still the president. He holds a PhD from Ghent University and is professor of experimental music composition at the Ghent Royal Conservatory.

== Life ==
Raes was born in Ghent, Belgium in 1952. He studied musicology and philosophy at the Ghent State University as well as piano, clarinet, percussion and composition at the Royal Conservatory of Music of Ghent.

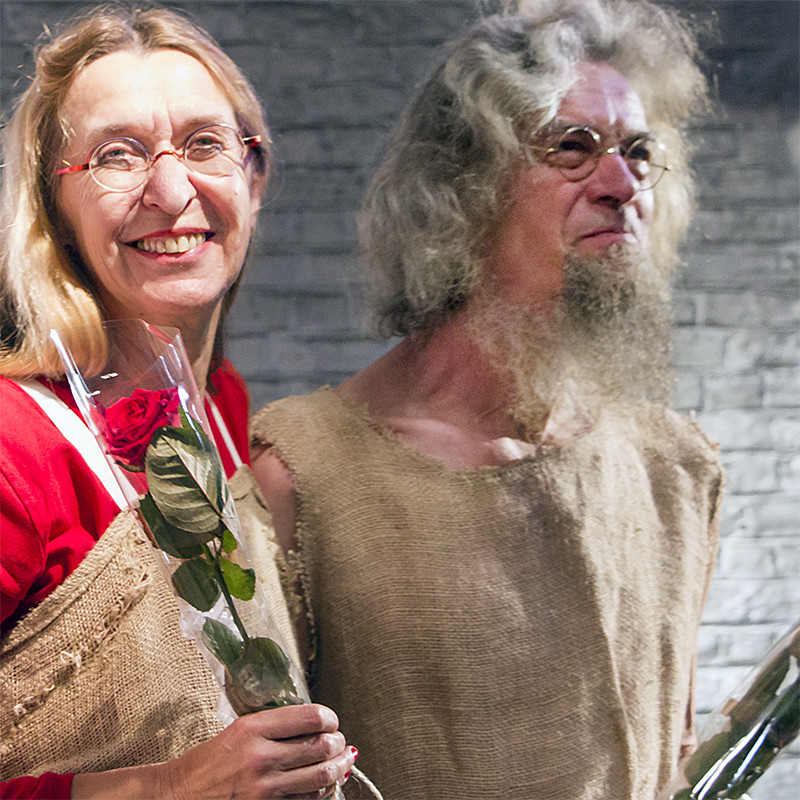
Moniek Darge & Raes after performing the Threepenny Opera in 2015

As a concert-organizer he has been responsible from 1973 until 1988 for the new-music concert programming of the Philharmonic Society at the Palais des Beaux Arts in Brussels. As a composer/performer and instrumentmaker he is the founder of the Logos- Group in 1968, out of which grew the Logos Duo, with Moniek Darge as well as the experimental M&M (Man and Machine) ensemble, operating with selfbuilt musical robots.

He has also published many critical essays and articles in specialized publications. In 1982 he received the Louis Paul Boon Award for the social engagement in his artistic work.

In 1990 he designed and constructed the Logos Tetrahedron (a tetrahedron-shaped concert-hall) for the Logos Foundation in Ghent, a project for which it received the Tech-Art prize 1990.

Next to his reputation as a composer, he is also a well known expert in computer technology and electronic art. His PhD from Ghent State University he got on the basis of his dissertation on the technology of virtual instruments of his design and invention. He is the author of an extensive real time algorithmic music composition programming language GMT, running on the Wintel platform. He made a musical robot upon request from Aphex Twin.
