= Taisha paggett =

American choreographer (born 1976)

taisha paggett
- Born: 1976 (age 48–49); Fresno, CA
- Education: UC Santa Cruz; UCLA
- Website: www.taishapaggett.net

Taisha Paggett (known professionally as taisha paggett) is a Los Angeles–based choreographer and artist. paggett is a faculty member at University of California, Riverside in the Department of Dance. She has experience working both onstage and in gallery settings. paggett was included in the 2014 Whitney Biennial and Made in LA, the Hammer Museums biennial in 2018.

== Education ==
Born in Fresno, California, paggett received her BA in 2002 in art history from UC Santa Cruz and her MFA in 2008 in choreography from UCLA.

== Career ==
Paggett's 2013 performance—verse chorus—was a commissioned performance at The Studio Museum in Harlem for perFOREmance, a series of performances for the museum's 2012–2013 exhibition, Fore, that featured the work of artists of African descent. verse chorus both utilized and deconstructed zumba; paggett was drawn to the "instructional format" of zumba and pop culture's ability to create "a sense of shared knowledge."

paggett presented underwaters (we is ready, we is ready) at the 2014 Whitney Biennial. paggett's underwaters was intended to be "immersive" and involved paggett interacting with the space as four different characters during a period of five days. Each of paggett's characters had demographic differences; the details of these differences were not shared with viewers. paggett transitioned into the characters in front of viewers and let each persona speak for themselves, with paggett remaining silent. Ultimately, paggett aimed to create a space that was not confined by space and time and could engage both with viewers present and with "spirits and other nonpresent entities"

paggett has performed in multiple companies and group projects. As a dancer, paggett has worked with David Roussève/Reality, Meg Wolfe, Stanley Love Performance Group, Fiona Dolenga-Marcotty, Vic Marks, Cid Pearlman, Cheng-Chieh Yu, Baker-Tarpaga Projects, Rebecca Alson-Milkman, Kelly Nipper, and Ultra-red. She has regularly collaborated with Ashley Hunt since 2004 on a project frequently called On Movement, Thought and Politics, including an exhibition at Sea and Space Explorations. paggett was also a dancer in the 2006 Mike Kelley film Day is Done.

paggett has performed and exhibited at The Whitney, The Studio Museum in Harlem, The Institute of Contemporary Art, University of Pennsylvania, Getty Villa, Cooper Union, Torrance Art Museum, Danspace at St Mark's Church (New York); Defibrillator (Chicago); Commonwealth & Council, Public Fiction, and LACE (Los Angeles Contemporary Exhibitions), The Off Center (San Francisco), and Basis Voor Actuele Kunst (Utrecht, NL).
