= Miriam Frink =

American educator (1892–1977)

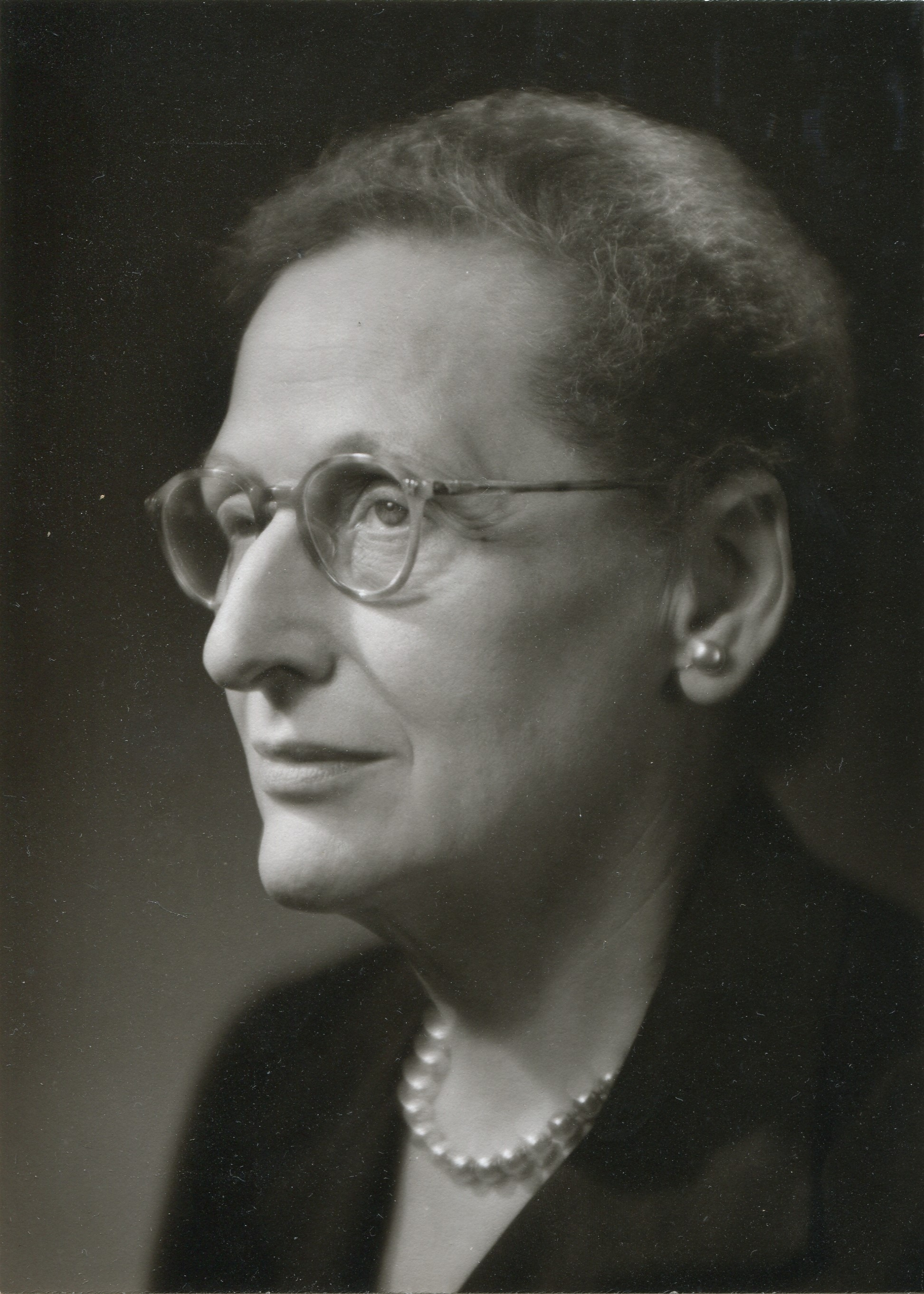
- Miriam Frink in 1955
- Born: August 4, 1892; Elkhart, Indiana
- Died: August 23, 1977 (aged 85); Mequon, Wisconsin
- Education: Milwaukee-Downer College, Smith College
- Occupation: Art educator
- Years active: 1915-1954
- Known for: Layton School of Art
- Partner: Charlotte Partridge

Miriam Frink (August 4, 1892 – August 23, 1977) was an art educator in Milwaukee, Wisconsin. Frink and her lifelong partner, artist Charlotte Partridge, established the Layton School of Art in 1921, acting as the school's co-directors for over thirty years until their joint resignation in 1954.

== Early life and education ==
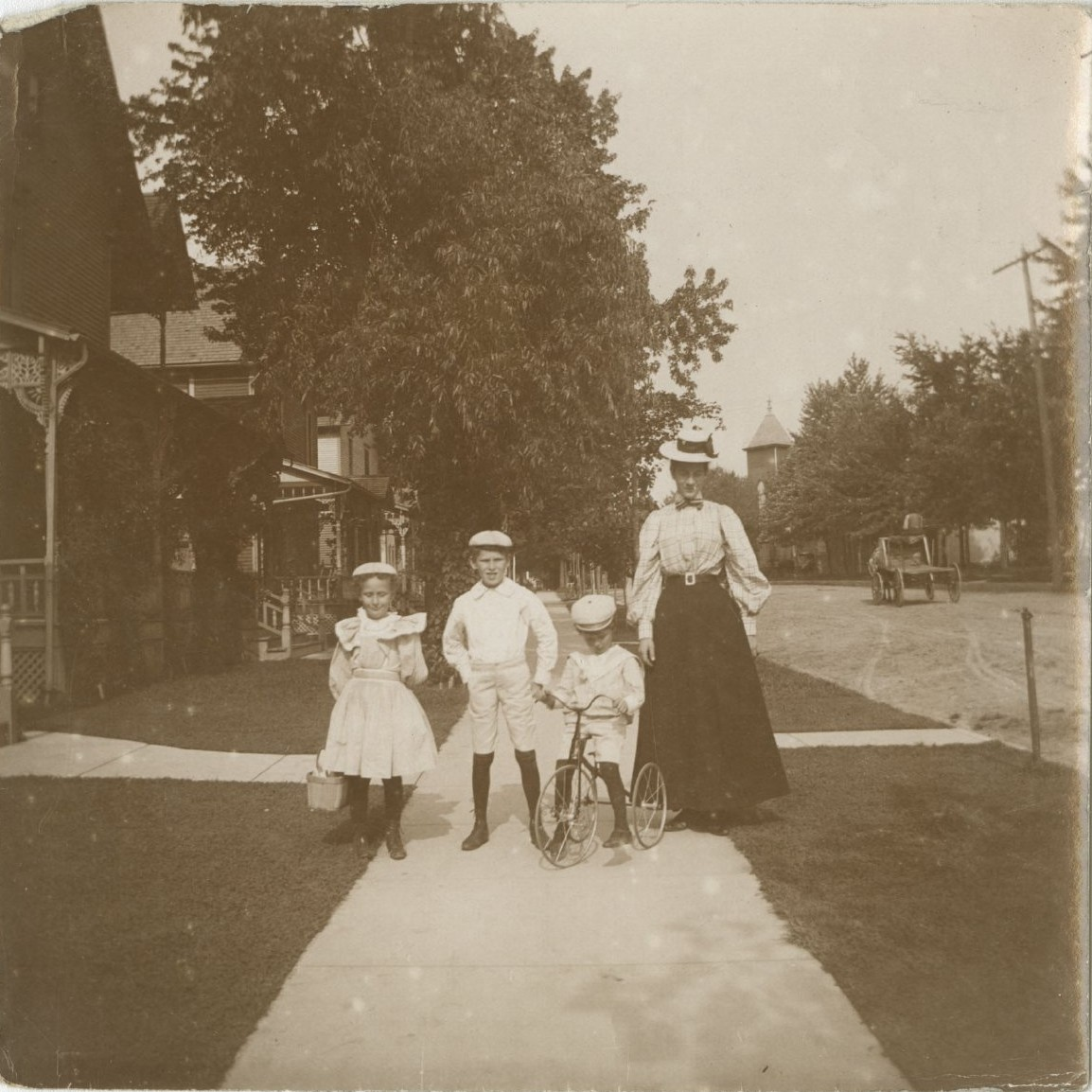
Miriam Frink (left) with brothers Charles and Maurice, and mother Maude, in Elkhart, c. 1900

Miriam Frink was born on August 4, 1892, in Elkhart, Indiana, where her father, Charles W. Frink (1863–1934), worked as a physician. After studying for two years at Milwaukee-Downer College, a women's college created in 1895, she transferred to Smith College, Massachusetts, where she graduated in 1914 with a degree in education. Upon completing her studies, her alma mater Downer College offered her a position as English teacher, prompting Frink to return to Wisconsin in 1915.

While at Downer, Frink met fellow professor Charlotte Partridge, head of the Fine Art Department. The two women began a romantic relationship and eventually moved in together. Both Partridge and Frink felt constrained by the conservative academic approach of college president Ellen Sabin, particularly regarding the presence of nude models in life drawing classes. In 1920, they left Downer to establish their own art school in the basement of Milwaukee's Layton Art Gallery.

== Layton School of Art ==
Shortly after the creation of Layton School of Art, Frink and Partridge hired painter Gerrit V. Sinclair as its first professor. While Partridge herself taught art classes, Frink took charge of teaching psychology and contemporary literature. In addition to the graduating cursus for art students, the school also offered free Saturday classes for children and daytime classes for adults. Mounting shows for the support of Wisconsin artists during the Great Depression and WWII, the school hit a record enrollment of 1,100 students in 1951.

During those years, in parallel to her administrative work for the school, Frink assisted Milwaukee organizer Meta Berger with the writing of her autobiography, though the text could not be published before Berger's death in 1944.

== Personal life ==
After moving together for the first time in 1921, Partridge and Frink oversaw the construction of a one-room cottage in Fox Point, north of Milwaukee, in 1930, which featured in an article in the Milwaukee Journal. They then moved in together into a new house they designed in Mequon in 1938.

Following their retirement, Partridge and Frink hired local museum curator Margaret Fish Rahill (1919–1998) to write the history of the Layton School of Art, though it remained unfinished by the time Fish left the project in 1970. Due to ill-health, Partridge moved into a nursing home in 1973, where she died on February 25, 1975. Frink died two years later, on August 23, 1977. She was buried in her childhood town of Elkhart, Indiana.

== Bibliography ==
- Wagner, R. Richard (2019). We've Been Here All Along: Wisconsin's Early Gay History. Madison, WI: Wisconsin Historical Society Press. ISBN 978-0870209123.
- Levine, Faythe (2024). As Ever, Miriam. Hudson, NY: Combos Press.
