= Meg Wolfe =

Meg Wolfe is a choreographer, performer, and artistic director based in Los Angeles, CA.

In the 1990s, Wolfe was part of New York City's downtown dance subculture. Her work was shown at Dance Theater Workshop/Fresh Tracks, Danspace Project at St. Mark's, Dia Center for the Arts, The Kitchen, The Living Theater, Movement Research at Judson Church, and others. She worked with Vicky Shick (1999-2003), Sigal Bergman, Yoshiko Chuma, Molissa Fenley, Clarinda Mac Low, and Susan Rethorst. In 2004, she moved to Los Angeles.

In Los Angeles, she has been shown at REDCAT, the 2011 Off Center Festival at the Segerstrom Center, the 2009 New Original Works Festival, the Commuter Festival at CalArts, Highways Performance Space, The Unknown Theater, Anatomy Riot, Sea and Space Explorations. Wolfe was named Faces to Watch in 2012: Dance, Theater, Architecture and Art in the LA Times.

Along the west coast, her work was presented at Looking Left Festival in Santa Cruz; Sushi's East/West Coast Performance Festival in San Diego, and Performance Works NorthWest in Portland, OR.

Wolfe is also co-editor of itch Dance Journal, the founder and artistic director of Show Box LA, and founder-curator of performance series Anatomy Riot.
