= Moniek Darge =

Belgian composer, musician, audio artist and educator

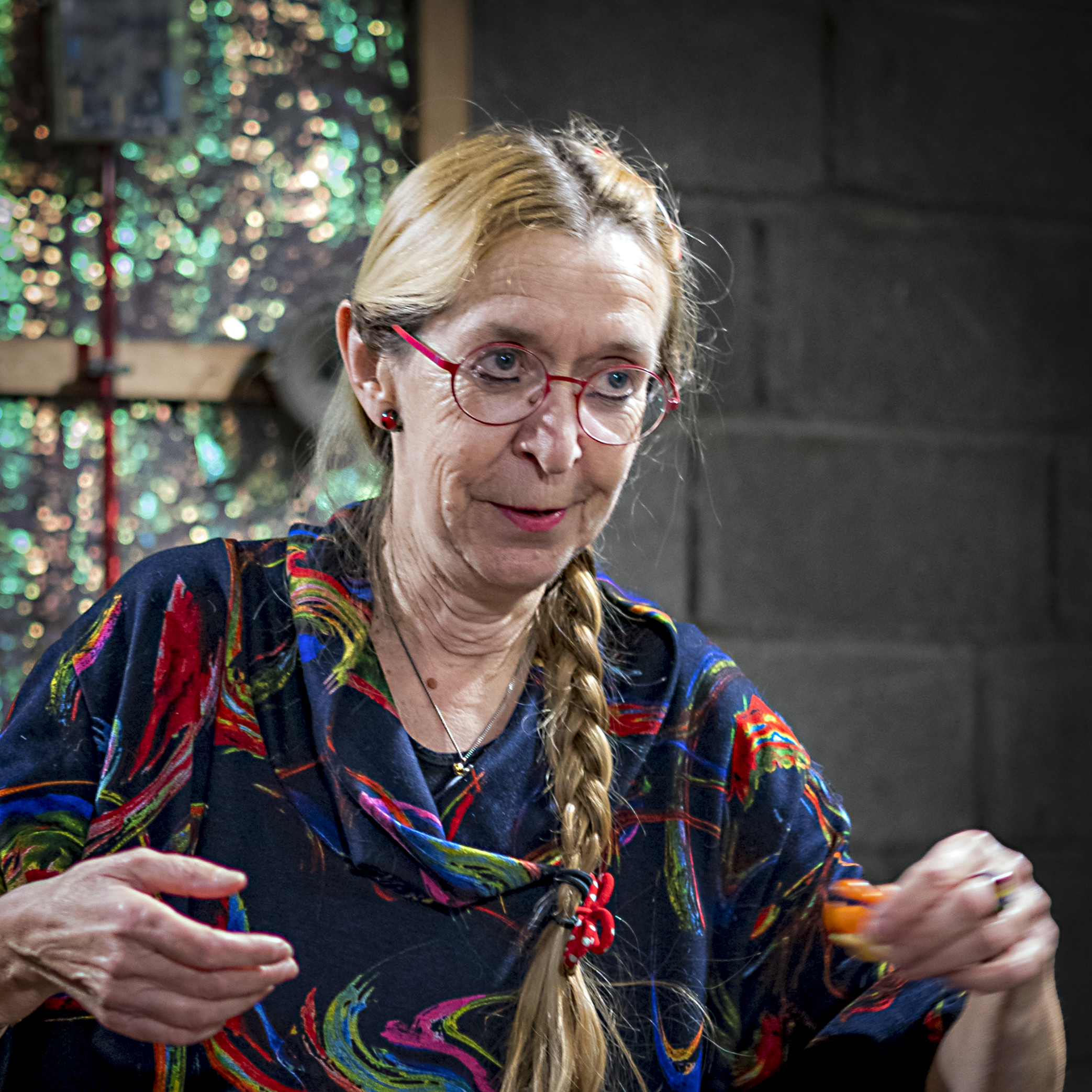
- in 2021
- Born: 1952 (age 73–74); Bruges
- Occupation: Composer

Moniek Darge or Monica Darge (born 1952) is a Belgian composer, musician, audio artist and educator. She was named a Cultural Ambassador of Flanders.

== Life ==
Darge was born in Bruges and studied violin and music theory at the Music Conservatory of Bruges, painting at the Royal Academy of Fine Arts in Ghent and art history, philosophy and anthropology at Ghent University. She taught courses on 20th century art history, audio art, non-western art studies and introduction to ethnomusicology as an assistant professor at the Hogeschool Gent, retiring in 2012.

She has performed around the world with the Logos Ensemble, with Godfried-Willem Raes in the Logos Duo and with the M&M (Man and Machine) robot ensemble. She was a founding member of Logos Women. She has also designed, constructed and performed on a number of alternate "music boxes". In her travels, Darge has collected field recordings of world music from Africa, Australia, New Zealand, Asia, Brazil and the Canadian Arctic (Inuit) that she incorporates into her soundscapes. She has also published articles and lectured on her musical experiences during her international travel.

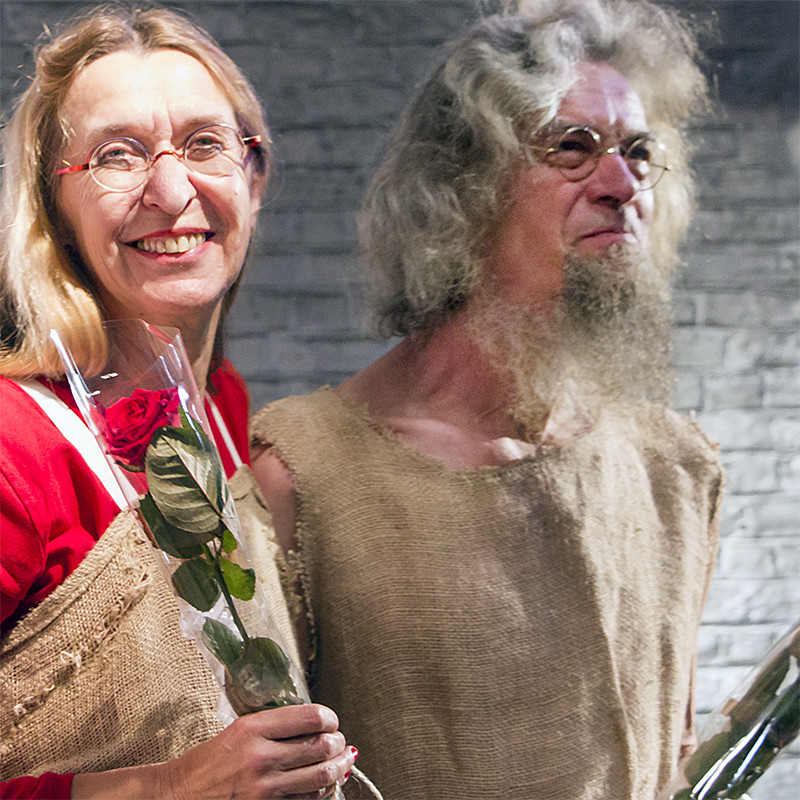
Moniek Darge & Godfried-Willem Raes after performing the Threepenny Opera in 2015

From 1970 to 1980, Darge helped organize a series of multimedia festivals. In 1992, she organized the Japanese Performance Festival in Ghent. She also organized an International Women’s Festival which incorporated music and performance art.

Darge received Meet The Composer grants for Los Angeles and New York City. In 1997, she was named Cultural Ambassador of Flanders.

Her 2005 composition "Whisper Ears" is one of the pieces chosen to play at the Radio Forest which is a sound installation created by Amy Franceschini and Stijn Schiffeleers near Neerpelt which was restyled by Koen Deprez.
