= Faythe Levine =

American photographer and filmmaker

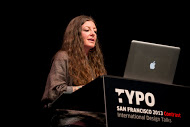
Faythe Levine at the Typo San Francisco conference in 2013

Faythe Levine (born 1977, Minneapolis, Minnesota) is an American curator, photographer, director, author, and at one time was a prominent figure in the D.I.Y. Ethic indie craft movement. Her work is centered on community, empowerment, and documentation. She grew up in the suburbs of Seattle in the 1990s and has lived in Minneapolis, Milwaukee, Birmingham, New Orleans, rural Middle Tennessee, and Sheboygan. She currently resides in the Hudson Valley, New York.

== Career ==
In 2002, she co-curated Flying Fish Gallery with filmmaker and musician Brent Goodsell. Flying Fish closed in 2003. From 2003 through 2009, Levine designed, made, and sold a small line of handmade goods under the moniker Flying Fish Design. In 2004, she founded a popular Midwest craft fair called Art vs. Craft that was successful for ten years until Levine moved from Milwaukee. Art vs. Craft and Flying Fish Design led to her producing and directing a documentary called Handmade Nation: The Rise of D.I.Y. Art, Craft, and Design, independently released in 2009.

A companion book with the same title was released in 2008 and published by Princeton Architectural Press. In 2005, she opened Paper Boat Boutique & Gallery in Milwaukee, Wisconsin, with business partner Kimberly Kisiolek, where she curated the gallery until it closed in 2009. While living in Milwaukee, Levine played the musical saw with the band Wooden Robot from 2002 to 2006. Wooden Robot is also the soundtrack of her first film, Handmade Nation. In 2013, Levine and co-director/author Sam Macon began producing her second documentary, Sign Painters, about the trade and tradition of hand-painted lettering in America, released in 2013. A companion book under the same title was published in October 2012 by Princeton Architectural Press. Between 2010 and 2013, Levine was the curator at Sky High Gallery in Milwaukee. That same year, Levine was selected as one of seven mid-career artists to show work in the two-year traveling exhibition Alien She, the first retrospective on Riot Grrrl and its influence.

In 2015, While living in rural Tennessee, she met and became friends with activist Merril Mushroom and collaborated on releasing Mushroom's one-act play written in the 1980s, Bar Dykes, about lesbian bar culture in the 1950s. Bar Dykes was designed and published by Pegacorn Press. In 2017, Levine began working as a curator at the John Micheal Kohler Arts Center in Sheboygan, WI. She became the Director of the Arts/Industry residency hosted at Kohler Co. and curated related exhibitions at the Arts Center. Since 2017 Levine has been researching the lives and partnership of Charlotte Partridge and Miriam Frink resulting in a book As Ever, Miriam, first published by OK Stamp Press in October 2024 and a related exhibition at the Lynden Sculpture Garden in 2025. In 2020, Levine moved to the Hudson Valley in New York. In June 2023, she was hired as the Hauser and Wirth Institute Archivist for Women's Studio Workshop in Rosendale, NY.

== Personal life ==
Levine's father, Rick Merlin Levine, is a master astrologer practicing since 1976 and the co-founder of Kepler College. Her mother, Suzanne Wechsler, is an organic farmer and co-owner along with her husband Roger Wechsler of Samish Bay Cheese in Washington State.

== Bibliography ==
- As Ever, Miriam (2024), OK Stamp Press [second edition, 2025, Combos Press]
- Bar Dykes (2015), Pegacorn Press
- Sign Painters (2012), Princeton Architectural Press, ISBN 978-1-616-89083-4
- Handmade Nation: The Rise of D.I.Y Art, Craft and Design (2008), Princeton Architectural Press, ISBN 978-1568987873
