= Julia Christensen =

American artist

Julia Christensen (born 1976) is a multidisciplinary artist and writer based in Oberlin, Ohio. She is the Eva and John Young-Hunter Professor of Studio Art at Oberlin College.

== Art practice ==
Julia Christensen's art practice spans photography, video, sound, installation, sculpture, and performance. Christensen's projects explore the intersections of technology, time, change, and memory. Her work has been presented at venues such as the Los Angeles County Museum of Art (Los Angeles, CA), Walker Art Center (Minneapolis, MN), Eyebeam (New York, NY), Ronald Feldman Gallery (New York, NY), Carnegie Museum of Fine Arts (Pittsburgh, PA), 21C Museum/Hotel (Louisville, KY), and the Museum of Contemporary Art (Cleveland, OH). Her work has been shown internationally in India, France, Greece, Croatia, Finland, and beyond.

Christensen's practice often consists of long-term research projects, expressed through multidisciplinary artworks. Her project, Big Box Reuse, examined the civic reuse of abandoned Walmart and Kmart stores in the United States; Big Box Reuse manifested as photography, video, installation, and her first book, Big Box Reuse (MIT Press, 2008). Her project, Waiting for a Break, tracked the formation of Lake Erie's ice in real time over the course of extreme winter conditions; the work resulted in a live video kiosk in downtown Cleveland, Ohio (commissioned by LAND studio), and a solo exhibition at SPACES (Cleveland, OH). Another project, Upgrade Available, is about the phenomenon of "upgrade culture," and how the perceived need to endlessly upgrade electronics impacts life in the 21st century; this research produced photography, installation, sculpture, and led Christensen to collaborate with scientists at NASA Jet Propulsion Laboratory to design spacecraft mission concepts that prioritize long-term technological stability.

== Writing ==
Julia Christensen is the author of Big Box Reuse, published by MIT Press in 2008, and Upgrade Available, published by Dancing Foxes Press in 2020.

Big Box Reuse is a culmination of her multi-year art project documenting the civic reuse of abandoned “big box” stores in the United States. The book presents case studies, through photography and writing by Christensen, of museums, schools, churches and more in renovated Walmart and Kmart buildings. Big Box Reuse was met with wide acclaim, and was reviewed and featured in The New York Review of Books, New York, The Washington Post, The New York Times, The New York Times Magazine, San Francisco Chronicle, Cleveland Plain Dealer, among other publications. Amazon.com named it one of the Top 10 Art Books of 2008; it won “Best of Category,” General Trade Illustrated Books in the 2009 New England Book Show (sponsored by Bookbuilders of Boston); it was selected as a winner in the Trade Illustrated Category and the Jackets and Covers Category, 2009 Association of American University Presses (AAUP) Book, Journal, and Jacket Show.

Upgrade Available documents an ongoing investigation by Christensen into how our relentless "upgrade culture"—the perceived notion that we need to constantly upgrade our electronics to remain relevant—fundamentally impacts our experience of time. In a personal narrative interspersed with related interdisciplinary artwork and conversations with experts from different fields (other artists, archivists, academics), Christensen takes readers along a path from the international "e-waste" industry to institutional archives, eventually leading her to NASA's Jet Propulsion Laboratory (JPL).

Christensen’s writing has also appeared in Slate, Hyperallergic, Print, Orion, and Cabinet magazines.

== Awards and honors ==
Christensen is a recipient of the Guggenheim Fellowship, Creative Capital Fellowship (Emerging Fields, 2013), LACMA Art + Tech Lab Fellowship (2017), Ohio Arts Council Individual Excellence Award (2015), SPACES R&D Award, and the MacDowell Fellowship (2015). She has received commissions from LAND studio (2017), Turbulence (2007), and New and Performing Arts Inc. (2007). Her work has been supported by artist residencies at the MacDowell Colony, Media Archaeology Lab (University of Colorado, Boulder), Experimental Television Center, and the Wexner Center for the Arts Film/Video Studio.

== Selected works ==
- Big box reuse, 2008
- Upgrade available, 2020
