= Astria Suparak =

American artist

Astria Suparak is an American artist, writer, and curator based in Oakland, California, known for her cross-disciplinary projects that address urgent political and cultural issues such as institutionalized racism, feminism, and colonialism through the lens of popular culture. Her work often takes the form of multimedia presentations, exhibitions, and publicly accessible tools and databases that document subcultures and perspectives omitted from mainstream narratives. Suparak’s projects have been exhibited at prominent institutions including the Museum of Modern Art, Institute of Contemporary Art Los Angeles, and the Walker Art Center, and she has curated for the Liverpool Biennial, Museo Tamayo in Mexico City, Yale University, Eyebeam, The Kitchen, PS1, and Expo Chicago, as well as unconventional spaces like roller-skating rinks and sports bars.

One of her most notable recent works is “Asian Futures, Without Asians”, a multimedia research project and performance lecture series that critiques the appropriation and misrepresentation of Asian cultures in American science fiction cinema over the last 50 years. This work examines the paradox of Asian-inspired aesthetics being utilized in futuristic narratives devoid of Asian people, highlighting films such as Blade Runner, Star Trek, and the Star Wars franchise. The project has been critically acclaimed and presented at venues including the Museum of Modern Art, the Wattis Institute for Contemporary Arts, and the ICA LA.

Suparak has also explored themes like sports fandom as cultural production in “Whatever It Takes: Steelers Fan Collections, Rituals, and Obsessions”, and feminist punk movements in “Alien She,” a traveling exhibition co-curated with Ceci Moss, which examined the impact of the Riot Grrrl movement. Her work has been featured in publications like Artforum, The New York Times, and The Los Angeles Times, and she was awarded the 2022 San Francisco Bay Area Artadia Award.

Previously, Suparak served as the director and curator of the Warehouse Gallery (Syracuse University) from 2006 to 2007 and the Pratt Film Series (Pratt Institute) from 1998 to 2000. Suparak was the director of Miller Gallery at Carnegie Mellon University, and has taught at the California College of the Arts, and University of San Francisco.

== Selected works ==
=== Asian futures, without Asians (2020 - Current) ===
Asian futures, without Asians is a series of new multimedia presentation by Suparak, which asks: “What does it mean when so many white filmmakers envision futures inflected by Asian culture, but devoid of actual Asian people?” The work is a one-hour long illustrated lecture that examines nearly 50 years of American science fiction cinema through the lens of Asian appropriation and whitewashing. The research-creation project examines how Asian cultures have been mixed and matched to create an interchangeable “Asian-ness” within futuristic sci-fi.

The performance lecture is includes images from dozens of futuristic movies and TV shows where she discusses the implications of not only borrowing heavily from Asian cultures, but at the same time decontextualizing and misrepresenting them. Her work also address the exclusion of Asian people in the imagination of high tech futures with Asian characteristics and architecture. She explores themes such as Anglicized names, chopsticks, misuse of traditional garments, head gears and hair styles as well as usage of Asian inspired architectures and interior spaces. Some films that Suparak criticizes in the work includes Blade Runner, Flash Gordon, Star Trek, 2001: A Space Odyssey, Soylent Green, Logan’s Run, and the Star Wars franchise.

The work has been presented at MoMa, the Jacob Lawrence Gallery at the University of Washington, the Wattis Institute in San Francisco (presented with the launch of the publication Why are they so afraid of the lotus?), ICA LA in Los Angeles (co-presented with GYOPO), Bard College in Annandale-On-Hudson, New York, George Mason University in Fairfax, Virginia, Centre A: Vancouver International Centre for Contemporary Asian Art, and Reed College in Portland, Oregon.

=== Other projects ===
- "Alien She," A major exhibition examining the lasting impact of the Riot Grrrl movement on contemporary artists and cultural producers, curated by Suparak and Ceci Moss.
- "Whatever It Takes: Steelers Fan Collections, Rituals, and Obsessions": Suparak and artist Jon Rubin curated the first exhibition that explored sports fan culture, based on the Pittsburgh football team, The Steelers.
- "Keep It Slick: Infiltrating Capitalism with The Yes Men : This was the first solo exhibition and retrospective of The Yes Men.
- "Some Kind of Loving": This was a curated video compilation produced by Joanie 4 Jackie, a movie distribution project produced by artist Miranda July, in 2000.
