= Charlotte Partridge =

American artist and educator (1882–1975)

Charlotte Russell Partridge
- Charlotte Partridge in 1957
- Born: November 24, 1882; Minneapolis, Minnesota
- Died: February 25, 1975 (aged 92); Mequon, Wisconsin
- Occupations: Painter, Art educator
- Years active: 1912-1973
- Known for: Layton School of Art
- Partner: Miriam Frink

Charlotte Partridge (November 24, 1882 – February 25, 1975) was an artist, arts educator, and community organizer. She was the co-founder and director of the Layton School of Art in Milwaukee, Wisconsin from 1920 to 1954, with her life partner Miriam Frink. They were credited with having developed a nationally accredited art school. Partridge also served as state chair and director of Wisconsin's Works Projects Administration, and published a national survey of art institutions and contemporary art for the Federal Works Agency in 1940. She received many awards recognizing her contributions to "the cause of art".

== Life and career ==
=== 1882–1919: Early life and education ===
Partridge was born in Minneapolis, Minnesota, on November 24, 1882 (although a passport issued later in life lists her birth year as 1886) to Frederick and Carrie Partridge. Partridge spent her childhood in Duluth, MN. She was enrolled in Dana Hall, a preparatory school in Massachusetts paid for by her mother's wealthy brother, and returned home after her father's death. Her mother, sister and brother relocated to Illinois where her mother later remarried. Partridge graduated from the Northern Illinois State Normal School in 1905 and taught second grade at the Whittier School in Oak Park, IL. In 1910, she enrolled in Emma Church's Chicago School of Applied and Normal Art (later renamed Church School of Art) and received her diploma in 1912 for a two-year course in normal art. Partridge taught at the Church School of Art one year after receiving her diploma and also taught at the Francis Parker School in Chicago and the Chicago Kindergarten College. During this time, Partridge also had a studio where she devoted herself to design work, freelanced as a commercial artist, and studied painting at the traditional Chicago Art Institute night school. In 1914 she joined the Fine Arts Department faculty at the Milwaukee Downer College and later became head of the Fine Arts Department where she initiated one of the first occupational therapy courses in the country, and remained on staff there through 1922. Partridge taught art as self-expression, a new concept in art education at the time. She also taught summers at Commonwealth School of Art and Industry in Boothbay Harbor, Maine until 1916 with her mentor and former teacher, Miss Emma M. Church. In 1915 Partridge met her life partner Miriam Frink who had returned to Downer College (where she held a degree) to teach freshman English.

=== 1920–1954: Layton School of Art and Layton Art Gallery ===
In 1920 Partridge and Frink became co-directors of the newly founded Layton School of Art. The trustees of Milwaukee's Layton Art Gallery committed their gallery basement to the school that became incorporated as a non-profit institution of higher learning that year. The school opened in the fall with 26 students enrolled for day classes and another 60 for evening school; there were also free Saturday classes for children. The furniture and supplies came from Partridge's mentor Emma Church (of the Church School of Art), who had recently closed her school. (Partridge declined the offer to be named director, not wanting to relocate to Chicago.) For the first few years the co-directors both continued teaching at Downer College while sharing the administrative duties and educational responsibilities at Layton. Partridge taught art classes and oversaw faculty and community activities while Frink taught literature appreciation and oversaw business and student activities. The Layton School of Art was considered non-traditional in many way compared to other contemporary art schools. Partridge and Frink believed by including a diverse curriculum including literature, psychology, drama, poetry, and music the students would learn to appreciate art in a more holistic manner, with the end goal to train students to earn a living in industrial art, commercial art, interior decoration, costume design, illustration and "normal" art.

In 1921 Partridge joined the Layton Art Gallery board of trustees and served for 51 years, until 1973. In 1922 she was appointed director and curator of the Layton Art Gallery, a position she kept for 31 years, until 1953. During her tenure as director of the Layton Gallery she modernized the space, showing local artists and contemporary exhibitions including people such as Frank Lloyd Wright who had his first-ever controversial exhibition there in 1930. Miriam Frink is quoted saying "Charlotte was the first person to give real understanding and support to the painters of Wisconsin and give them a gallery where they could exhibit."

In 1951 the Layton School of Art enrollment was at 1,100 students, and the school moved into the new Bauhaus-style building on Prospect Avenue, later razed for freeway construction. Then in 1954 Partridge and Frink were forced to retire as directors of the Layton School of Art. 1954 meeting, the Layton Board of Trustees voted to "retire" Partridge and Frink, both of whom objected. The retirement was effective immediately much to the dismay of faculty, students, and alumni. The Layton Board of Trustees had already selected Edmund Lewandowski to replace them. The Board's position was that the work was too exhausting for them, but Partridge was told the school should be directed by a man.

Margaret Davis Clark, an alumna, later said, "I felt it was the beginning of the end. The school could not go on in the same way. It was very sad."

Upon retirement, Charlotte and Miriam were honored by the Milwaukee Common Council for having built an "art school nationally accredited and recognized for the excellence of its work".

=== 1933–1940: Works Projects Administration (WPA) and Federal Art Project (FAP) ===
The Works Projects Administration (WPA) was a public program that included funding for arts with the purpose to provide employment for American's during the depression. One of the WPA projects was Federal Project Number One, under this umbrella were five additional programs focusing on different areas in the arts including the Federal Art Project (FAP). The FAP was federally funded in Wisconsin from 1935 to 1939, when it became state funded and was renamed the Wisconsin WPA Art Program. One of the public works projects active in Wisconsin under the WPA that interacted with the local FAP chapter was the Milwaukee Handicrafts Project (MHP) that was praised by First Lady Eleanor Roosevelt who visited in 1936, writing about her experiences in her newspaper column, "My Day": "I have just come back from one of the most interesting mornings I have ever spent. Milwaukee has a handicraft project for unskilled women which gives one a perfect thrill. They are doing artistic work under most able teachers", Roosevelt wrote.

From 1933 to 1934, Partridge served as the Wisconsin State Chair for the Federal Art Project (FAP). In 1935 she was appointed director of the Wisconsin Federal Art Project and held that position until 1939. In 1940, Partridge produced a Federal Works Agency report that surveyed art institutions and contemporary art in the United States.

=== 1955–1975: Clubs, organizations, awards and retirement ===
Partridge was involved in numerous clubs and organizations over the course of her life including; a member and the first president (date unknown) of Wisconsin Designer Craftsmen, American Institute of Architects, Delta Kappa Gamma, the College Arts Association, Wisconsin Painters and Sculptors, president of the Women's Club of Wisconsin (date unknown), and member and president (1928-1929) of the Zona club. Partridge was awarded a distinguished service award by the Wisconsin Chapter of the American Institute of Architects, who cited her for "a lifetime of activity in promoting the cause of art".

Partridge and Frink were honored by the Milwaukee Common Council for having built an "art school nationally accredited and recognized for the excellence of its work" and The Layton Art League established the "Charlotte Partridge-Miriam Frink Scholarship" awarding $500 annually to a Layton School of Art student of merit. She received the Wisconsin governor's award for "individual support of the arts" and an honorary PhD of Fine Arts from Lawrence University in 1969. University President Thomas S. Smith called her contributions farsighted, even prophetic, "beyond the field of art into industry and the general cultural and social life of the state".

In the early 1950s Partridge pitched a proposal to her fellow Zonta Club members for housing middle-income elderly women in independent living rental apartments called Zonta Manor. As president of the Zonta Service Committee, she led the Zonta Manor project working with architects Willis and Lillian Leenhouts. From 1957 to 1965 Partridge served as president of Zonta Manor Inc. In 1967 the Zonta Manor ran into financial difficulty and ownership transferred to the American Baptist Management Corporation which carried on its original purpose. Partridge was a board member (1966-1969) of the Walnut Area Improvement Council (WAICO), a grassroots organization made up of local Black residents working to improve their neighborhood. She did "whatever was asked of her" which included guiding the group in parliamentary procedure and recruiting artists to teach at the community house. Partridge was also an advocate of community gardens as a community organizing tool in order to inspire what was later named "Operation Green".

== Personal life ==
Partridge met fellow teacher Miriam Frink at Downer College in 1915. Frink was born on August 4, 1892, in Elkhart, Indiana, and had joined the school's faculty a year prior. In 1920, they jointly opened the Layton School of Art and became co-directors of the school while continuing to teach at Downer until 1922. They co-directed the Layton School of Art for 34 years. Partridge once said: "Miss Frink is the head and I am the feet of the school."

In 1930, Partridge and Frink built a studio summer cottage in Fox Point, designed by Partridge, where they wrote their initials in wet cement of the fireplace. The couple, however, lived most of their lives in a home designed by architect Harry William Bogner in 1938 according to sketches drawn by Partridge. In 1973, Partridge entered the Mequon Care Center. After her death on February 25, 1975, at the age of 92, Frink continued to work with her niece Susie Habenicht to write a history of the Layton School of Art, though it was never published. Frink moved out of the couple's home to live in the Mequon Care Center in 1977. She died on August 23 of that year, at the age of 85.
