= Amy Franceschini =

American artist and designer

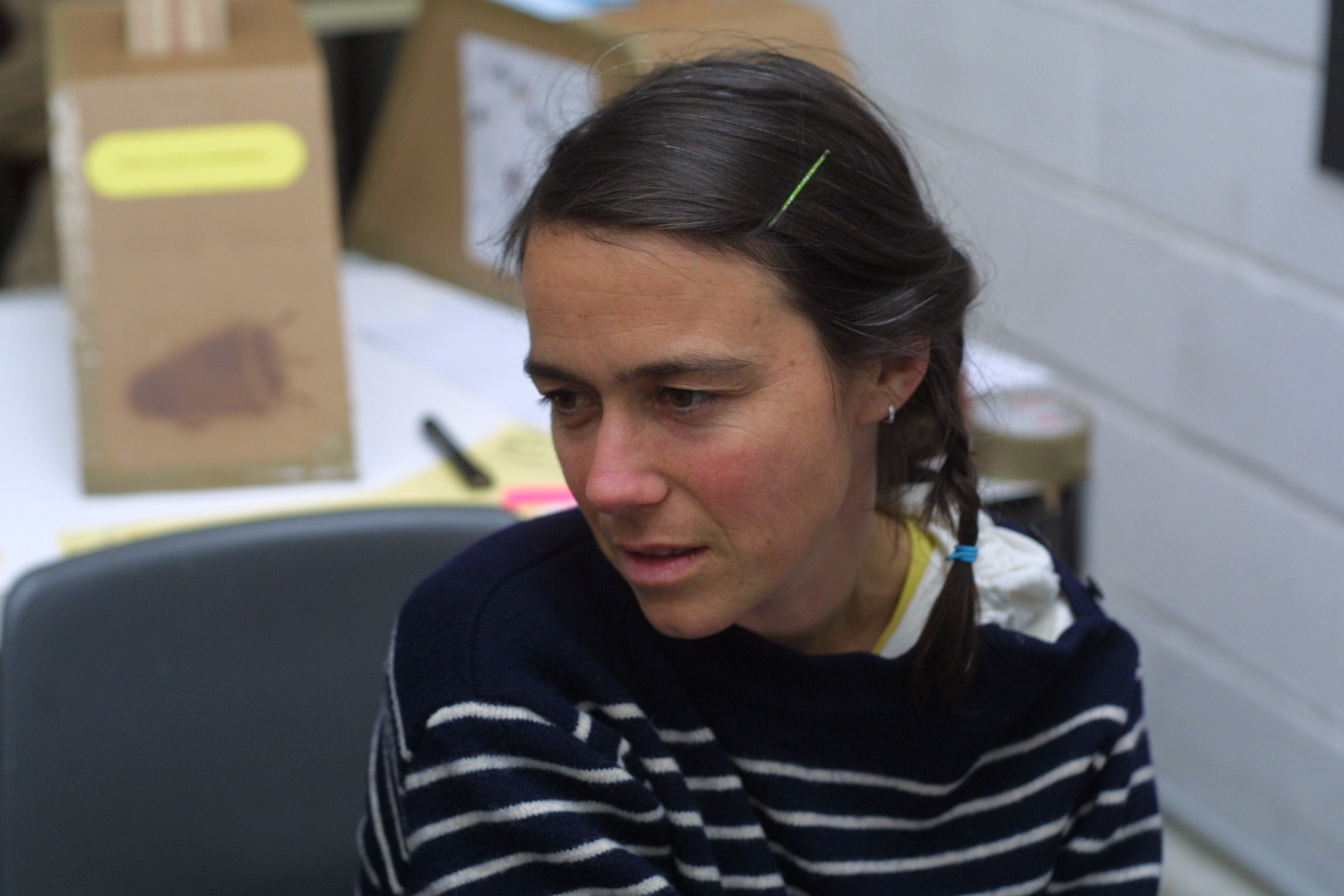
- Born: Amy M. Franceschini; September 9, 1970 (age 55); Patterson, California
- Education: San Francisco State University, Stanford University
- Known for: drawing, painting, sculpture, film, and performance
- Movement: Net art, Eco art
- Awards: SECA Art Award from San Francisco Museum of Modern Art 2006, Artadia Award from The Fund for Art and Dialog 2005, Golden Nica from Ars Electronica 2001

Amy Franceschini (born 1970, in Patterson, California) is a contemporary American artist and designer. Her practice spans a broad range of media including drawing, sculpture, design, net art, public art and gardening. She was a 2010 Guggenheim Fellow. Franceschini in 2009 was also a recipient of the Creative Capital Award in the discipline of Emerging Fields.

== Life and work ==
Franceschini founded Futurefarmers in 1995 as a way to bring together multidisciplinary artists. Through Futurefarmers she has collaborated with a number of artists, including Sascha Merg, Josh On. In 2002 she began graduate studies at Stanford University, and in 2004 she co-founded Free Soil, an international collective working between reflection, research and design. She was the lead artist of "Soil Kitchen", which is a temporary, windmill-powered architectural intervention and multi-use space where citizens enjoy free soup in exchange for soil samples; "Soil Kitchen" also offered free pH and heavy metal testing and produced a Philadelphia Brownfields Map and Soil Archive.

She has taught at Stanford University and the San Francisco Art Institute, where she lectured on media theory and taught practical courses. Her aim is to sensitize students to the interaction between design and processes that appear to be unrelated.

Frequent themes in Franceschini's work are gardening, public space, technology, and social change.

Franceschini's work often takes a visual approach to articulating perceived conflicts between humans and nature, and the individual to a community. She works both as an artist as well as a designer. In 2010 she co-authored (with Daniel Tucker) the book "Farm Together Now: A Portrait of People, Places and Ideas for a New Food Movement", which features interviews and photos essays (by Anne Hamersky) with politically engaged farmers across the United States.

== Exhibitions ==
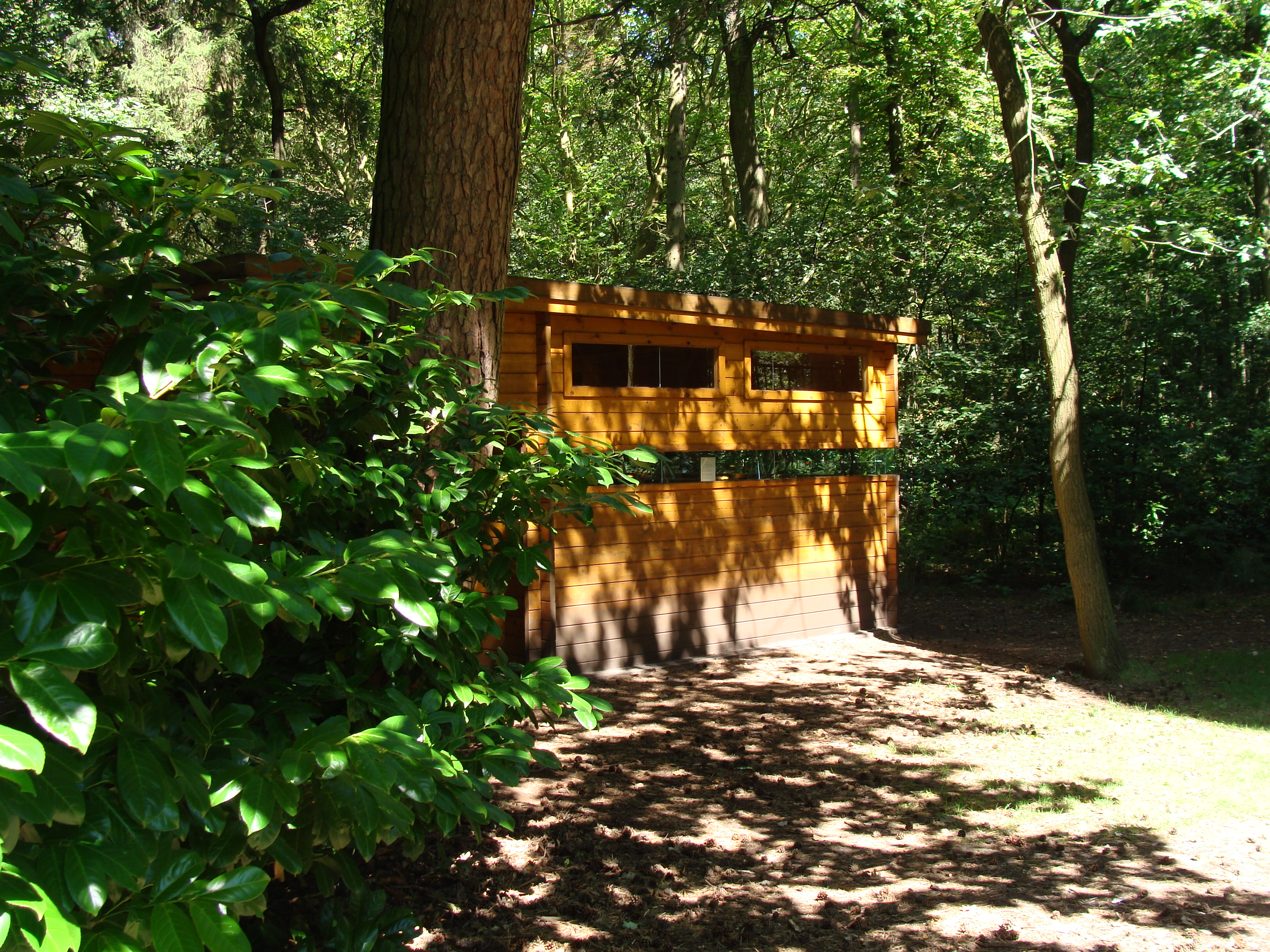
Radio Forest by Franceschini and Stijn Schiffeleers

Radio Forest is a sound installation created by Franceschini and Stijn Schiffeleers near Neerpelt which was restyled by Koen Deprez. The installation plays the music of the forest including work by the Flemish composer Moniek Darge.

In 2005 she was part of the "SAFE: Design takes on risk" exhibition at MoMA, showing the work Homeland Security Blanket (made with Michael Swaine). In 2006 she participated in the SECA Art Award exhibition at the San Francisco Museum of Modern Art. She has also exhibited at the Platform Garanti Contemporary Art Center in Istanbul Turkey, ZKM (Center for Art and Media) in Karlsruhe Germany, Cooper-Hewitt, National Design Museum in New York, Yerba Buena Center for the Arts in San Francisco, California and Gallery 16 in San Francisco, California.

Futurefarmers was featured in the 2002 Whitney Biennial.
