= Gail Wight =

American new media artist and professor (born 1960)

- Born: 1960 (age 65–66); Sunny Valley, Connecticut
- Education: Massachusetts College of Art and Design, San Francisco Art Institute
- Style: New Media Art

Gail Wight (born 1960, in Sunny Valley, Connecticut) is an American new media artist and professor, whose work fuses art with biology, neurology, and technology. Popular media Wight uses to create art include, drawing and painting, electronic sculpture, interactive sculpture, video and living mediums. Since 2003, Wight has taught at Stanford University in the Department of Art.

== Early life and education ==
In 1988, she received her B.F.A. from the Studio for Interrelated Media at the Massachusetts College of Art and Design in Boston, and in 1994, she received an M.F.A. in New Genres from the San Francisco Art Institute.

== Career ==
Wight began as a research assistant in 1988 at the Design Lab of the Massachusetts Institute of Technology in Cambridge, Massachusetts, and in 2003, she started her teaching career at Mills College in Oakland, California, as an assistant professor, as well as the director and co-founder of their Intermedia Arts program. In 2003, she moved to teaching at Stanford University, where she is an associate professor in the department of Art and Art History, teaching courses in experimental media arts.

As an artist, she works at the intersection of art and science, especially biology, neuroscience, and the history of technology. She explores, often humorously, how muddled our understanding of life and human relationships can become when we rely too much on science to explain our lives. In a 2008 project, Ground Plane, for example, she photographed fossil bones in snowflake-like patterns to create a meditation on both ephemerality and deep time. For her projects, she frequently undertakes short-term informal apprenticeships with scientists, a process she refers to as 'lurking'.

Wight's concentration on scientific and technological elements in her artwork stemmed from a childhood curiosity about a family member's illness that was never talked about. Learning all that she could about contemporary biology prompted her to branch out in her artwork, and today she works with a mix of sculpture, video, interactive media, installations, print, and text. Hydraphilia (2009) is a video installation of the microscopic growth patterns of Physarum polycephalum, better known as slime mold. Wight was inspired to use slime mold because of the organism's naturally beautiful coloration patterns that shift as it reproduces and develops. She created Hydraphilia by videotaping the growth patterns of the slime mold on agar slides, prepared with non-toxic dyes.

Wight’s 2003 series, Anatomies, evokes childhood curiosity as well. In exploded views, Wight pulls apart wind-up mechanical toys, “arranging their mechanical parts into anatomical charts, the quintessential tool of Cartesian understanding.” Elizabeth Mickaily-Huber, Ph.D., Adjunct Professor, Department of Engineering at the University of San Francisco, writes, “Gail Wight’s work brings to mind a child's natural inclination to break toys apart to understand how they work and what's inside….Gail's selection of toys goes from those that represent the genius of nature to those that represent the intellect of humans, from animals to little robots.”

Wight has exhibited widely, with solo exhibitions at the Beall Center for Art + Technology (Irvine, California), the Nevada Museum of Art (Reno), and the San Francisco Center for the Book, as well as numerous group exhibitions around the world, including the International Biennial of Contemporary Art Of Seville (Spain), the Natural History Museum (London), and The Physics Room (Christchurch, New Zealand).

== Exhibitions ==
These are a select list of exhibitions by Wight

=== Solo ===
- 2013 “All the Time in the World” Clay Center for Art & Science, Charleston, West Virginia (with Mary Tsiongas)
- 2012 “Ground Plane” Patricia Sweetow Gallery, San Francisco, California
- 2012 “Hydraphilia”, Nevada Museum of Art, Reno, Nevada
- 2007 “The Evolution of Disarticulation: Gail Wight, photographs, small-scale installations, and video”, University of New Mexico Art Museum, Albuquerque, New Mexico
- 2007 “The Anatomies” Ontario Science Museum Toronto, Ontario

=== Group ===
- 2021 "Pulled Apart" University of San Francisco Thacher Gallery
- 2006 “Unhomely: Phantom Scenes in Global Society” International Biennial of Contemporary Art Of Seville, Spain (in collaboration with Retort)

== Awards and grants ==
- Iris F. Litt Award. Clayman Institute, Stanford University, 2007
- Adaline Kent Award. San Francisco, California, 2003
- Anonymous Was A Woman Award. New York, New York, 2002
- Wallace Gerbode Visual Arts Award. San Francisco, California, 2001
- Chauncey McKeever Fine Art Award. San Francisco Art Institute, San Francisco, California, 1994
- Jacob K. Javits Fellow. U.S. Department of Education, 1991-1994
