= The Sacrifice of Iphigenia =

Painting by Paul Delvaux

- Artist: Paul Delvaux
- Year: 1968
- Medium: Oil on canvas
- Dimensions: 188 cm × 142.2 cm (74 in × 56.0 in)
- Location: Private collection

The Sacrifice of Iphigenia (French: Le sacrifice d'Iphigénie) is a 1968 painting by the Belgian artist Paul Delvaux. Inspired by Iphigenia's sacrifice in Greek mythology, it depicts five people on a boardwalk. In the foreground are three women, two of whom might be the same person who watches herself, and behind them appears to be a scene of human sacrifice where a man overlooks a woman with an exposed breast.

Painted in oil on canvas, The Sacrifice of Iphigenia was made during a period when Delvaux frequently made references to classical mythology in his works. It uses ambiguous symbols and has been interpreted as a work about sexual initiation. It was exhibited at the 34th Venice Biennale in 1968.

== Subject and composition ==
The Sacrifice of Iphigenia references a scene in Greek mythology. Ahead of the Trojan War, the Greek fleet leader Agamemnon needs to sacrifice his daughter Iphigenia to appease the goddess Artemis and receive the wind necessary to sail to Troy and lay siege on the city. The outcome of the task varies in different versions of the myth: in some versions Agamemnon does kill his daughter, and in other versions Artemis replaces Iphigenia with a deer.

In Paul Delvaux's treatment of the myth, four women and one man can be seen on an outdoor porch or boardwalk. The three women in the foreground are covered by a roof. Foremost and largest in the image is a blonde woman with large eyes and a lacy white dress, passively seated with her clasped hands in her lap. To the left in the picture is a very similar blonde woman who stands on a small, red carpet, flanked by a large mirror and several freestanding doors. She is dressed in light blue shift, her arms are along her body and her hands are slightly raised, as she appears to observe the woman at the centre. To the right in the picture is a woman in a blue evening dress and dark hair; she may be Clytemnestra, Iphigenia's mother. In the background is a man in a dinner suit, turned away from the viewer and overlooking a woman who lies down, is draped in purple cloth and has one breast exposed. Behind the boardwalk is a river and on the opposite shore a freight train and a nightly cityscape.

Delvaux made the painting in March 1968 and it is signed "P. Delvaux 3-68". It is painted in oil on canvas and has the dimensions 188 cm × 142.2 cm (74.0 in × 56.0 in).

== Analysis and reception ==
Delvaux included ancient Greek and Roman elements in his paintings throughout his career and The Sacrifice of Iphigenia was made during a period in the late 1960s when he frequently used stories from classical mythology in his works. Conor Jordan of Christie's says the painting has no references to classical antiquity beyond the mythological subject, and instead captures the tension of the impending human sacrifice. The white lace dress of the central woman may be a reference to the marriage to Achilles that Iphigenia falsely is promised in the myth. The art historian and archaeologist Philippe Jockey says The Sacrifice of Iphigenia is an example of how Delvaux used conventions from classical sculpture in his work, and is a painting that "demands a considerable artistic culture from the viewer". According to Jockey, the viewer is invited to recognise the "general economy" of Greek sculpture from the seventh century B.C. in the woman to the left in the picture.

The uses of architecture, illogical composition, theatricality and odd angles in The Sacrifice of Iphigenia show influence from Giorgio de Chirico, but instead of the columns and arcades typical of Chiricio's paintings, Delvaux has depicted a Northern European city. The painting contains ambiguous symbols and selected influences from surrealism but was not made with surrealist techniques. Unlike the surrealists, Delvaux did not try to derive images from the unconscious mind; everything is drawn from past or present reality. In Der neue Pauly, Andrejs Petrowski and Bert Klein highlight the complexity of the painting and interpret it as a work about sexual initiation, where the woman's death should be understood through the expression la petite mort (lit. 'the little death'), which means orgasm. They say the foreground represents preparation and the middle section the act itself, and regard the woman in the wedding dress as the same person as the one to the left, who watches herself from outside. The authors connect the train in the background to Delvaux's painting The Iron Age (1951), which shows a train in a context of sexual threat.

The Argentine writer Julio Cortázar used details from The Sacrifice of Iphigenia and other Delvaux paintings in his erotic short story "Siestas", published in the volume Último round (1969).

== Provenance ==
The Sacrifice of Iphigenia was exhibited at the 34th Venice Biennale in 1968 and sold through the Galerie Le Bateau Lavoir in Paris the same year. It has been exhibited at the Musée des Arts décoratifs in Paris in 1969, the Musée des beaux-arts in Mons in 1970, and as part of a 1975 Delvaux exhibition at the Tokyo National Museum of Modern Art and Kyoto National Museum of Modern Art. A private owner who bought it in 2007 sold it through Christie's in 2010 for 1,314,500 US dollars.

== See also ==
- Depictions of the sacrifice of Iphigenia
- Trains in art
