= Gnome Watching Railway Train =

Painting by Carl Spitzweg

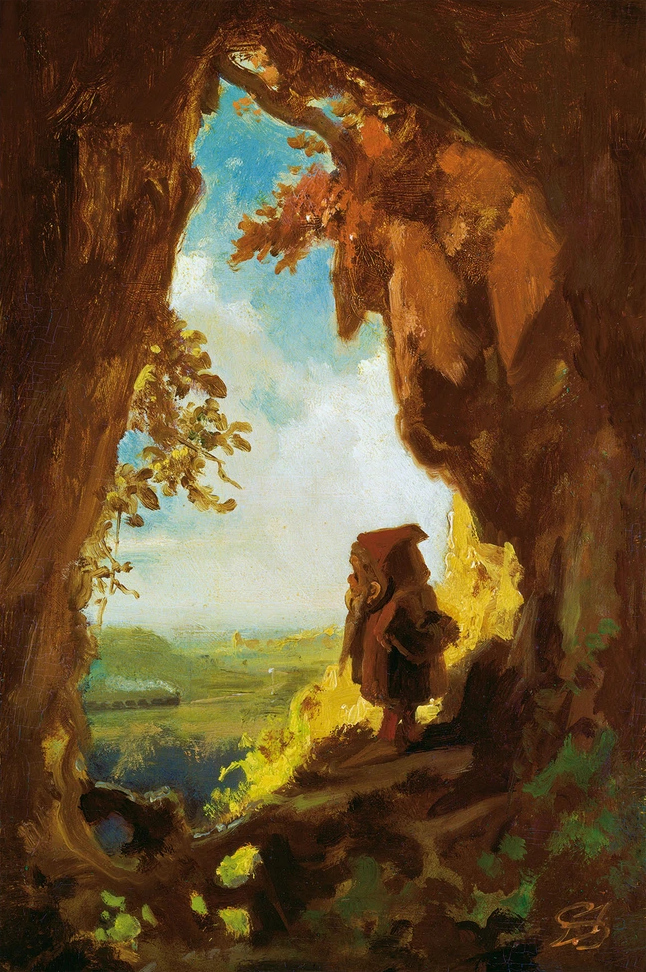
- Artist: Carl Spitzweg
- Year: 1848
- Medium: Oil-on-wood
- Dimensions: 24 cm × 14.7 cm (9.4 in × 5.8 in)
- Location: Private collection

Gnome Watching Railway Train (German: Gnom, Eisenbahn betrachtend) is an oil-on-wood painting by the German painter Carl Spitzweg, from 1848.

== Description ==
A small gnome with a grey beard and a pointed hat stands at the entrance of a cave at a high altitude. He looks out over a landscape with hills and trees and a town in the distant background. At the foot of a hill, the silhouette of a railway train passes by and pours out grey smoke from the locomotive.

== Analysis ==
In 2008, the art historian Florian Illies made a comparison to J. M. W. Turner's Rain, Steam and Speed – The Great Western Railway (1844), "modernity's break-in into art history", and interpreted Gnome Watching Railway Train as Spitzweg's self-ironic comment to his reputation as someone who wanted to stop time. According to Illies, Spitzweg's gnome is a caricature of someone who thinks he can watch the modern world come and go from his cave.

Analysing the painting in 2018, the German studies scholar Theodore Ziolkowski grouped it with Charles Dickens' novel Dombey and Son (1848), William Wordsworth's poem "On the Projected Kendal and Windermere Railway" (1844) and several texts by Joseph Freiherr von Eichendorff. The railway here symbolises the new technology, which is accepted but also regarded as destructive. Spitzweg's composition, with an elevated figure gazing across a landscape, had previously been used by romantic painters like Caspar David Friedrich, John Constable and Eugène Delacroix. Instead of conveying a romantic message, however, Spitzweg's gnome is humouristic, and the seemingly idyllic painting is ironic. Ziolkowski wrote: "No painting could mark more precisely the artist's recognition that the Romanticism in which he began his career has been displaced by the technological developments of the contemporary world—the developments that inform his contemporary Biedermeier culture as well as the approaching Realism. The Romantic reverence for art, which it regarded as a substitute for religion, has given way to humor and irony."

== History ==
Gnome Watching Railway Train was made a decade after the opening of the first railway line in Germany, and the technology had rapidly become commonplace. It was painted with oil on the lid of a cigar box.

== Provenance ==
The painting has belonged to Spitzweg's nephew-in-law Major Karl Loreck, Hugo Helbing in Munich, E. Ullmann in Vienna, H. Meyer in Munich (from October 1937) and H. E. Martini in Augsburg (from 1951). On 5 April 2008 it was sold at auction for 69,600 euro.

Since the 1950s, it has also gone under the name Gnomen (English: Gnomes). This was caused by a mistake from Günther Rönnefahrt during his catalogization of Spitzweg's works. Rönnefahrt only had access to a black-and-white photograph of the painting and thought he saw a second gnome in the shadows of the cave.

== See also ==
- Paracelsus, who coined the word gnome
- Trains in art
