= Bridges in art =

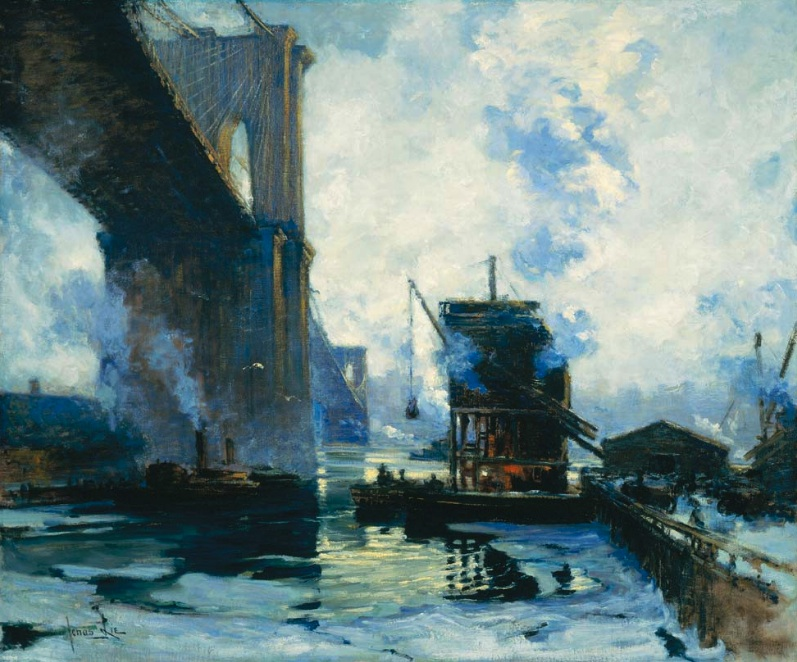
In Morning on the River, by Jonas Lie (1911-12), the Brooklyn Bridge adds depth through both perspective and atmospherics and its diagonal visual mass is compositionally balanced by the dock and building

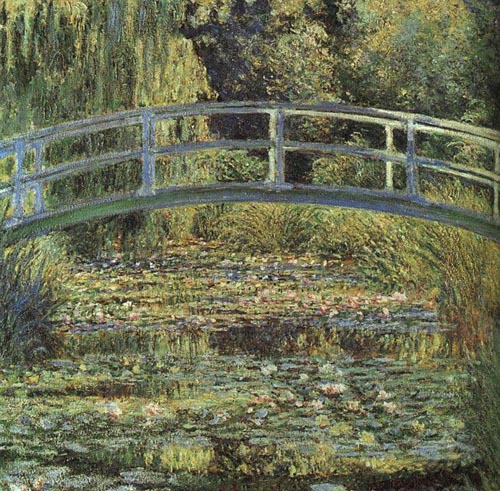
Claude Monet's The Waterlily Pond, green harmony, c. 1899

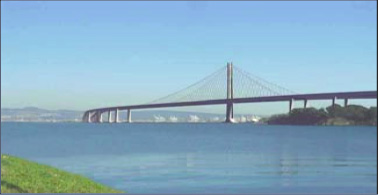
Rendering of proposed new eastern span for San Francisco–Oakland Bay Bridge, designed for more than mere functionality and becoming quite costly to build

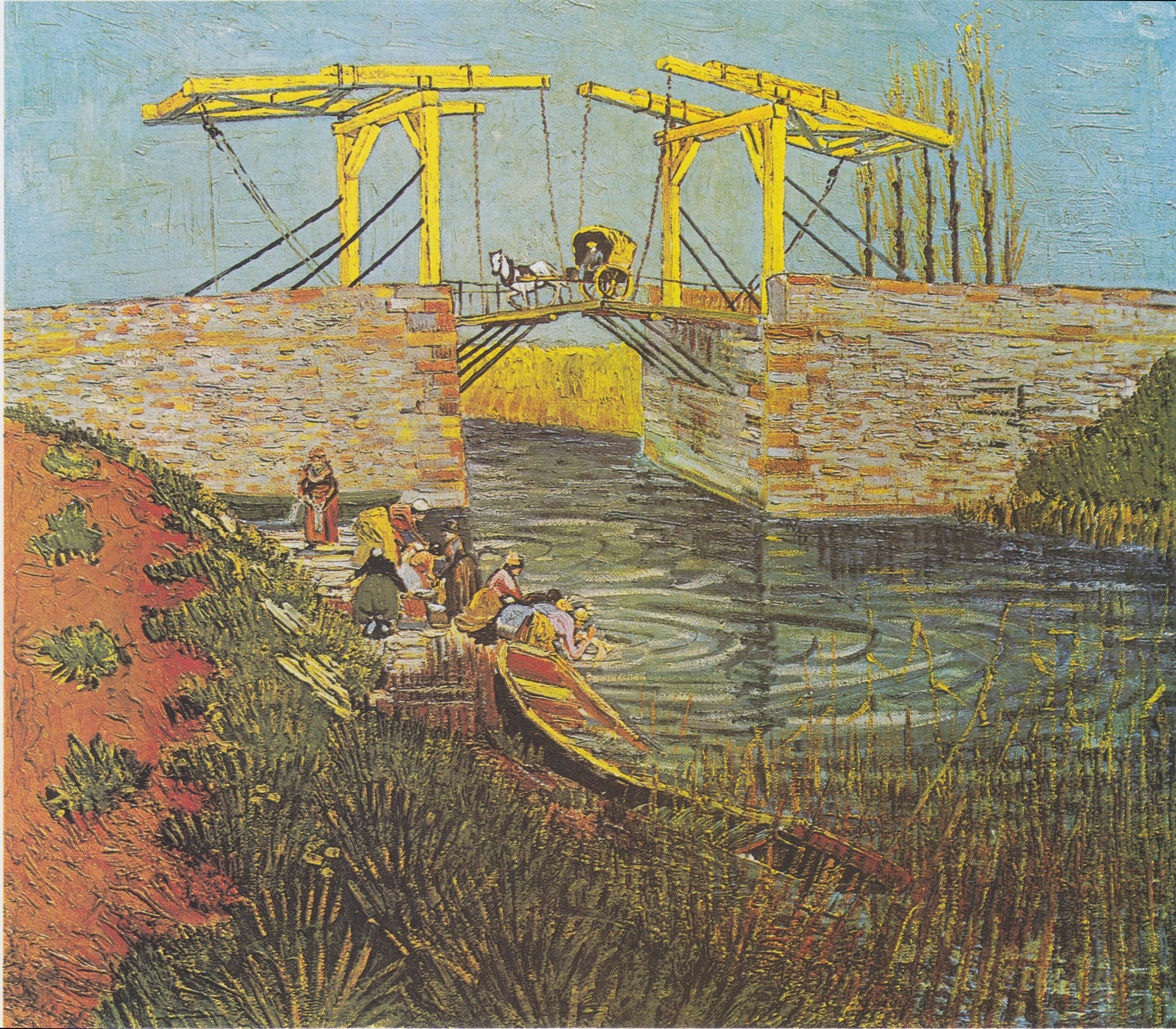
Van Gogh's Le Pont de l'Anglois, 1888

A bridge can play many roles in art, such as a work of art in itself in addition to any functional considerations; as a focal point for a novel or film; as a metaphor in song or poetry; as the subject of a painting or photograph; or as a home for other works of art, such as sculptures.

== Poems ==
- The nursery rhyme "London Bridge is falling down"
- William McGonagall's 1880 poem on "The Tay Bridge Disaster"
- Wordsworth's famous sonnet "Composed upon Westminster Bridge, September 3, 1802", opening with the famous lines, referring to the view from the bridge,
  Earth has not anything to show more fair:
  Dull would he be of soul who could pass by
  A sight so touching in its majesty.
- Julia A. Moore's poem on the Ashtabula Disaster:
  Have you heard of the dreadful fate
  Of Mr. P. P. Bliss and wife?
  Of their death I will relate,
  And also others lost their life;
  Ashtabula Bridge disaster,
  Where so many people died
  Without a thought that destruction
  Would plunge them 'neath the wheel of tide. (1879)

== Motion pictures ==
- Bridge (1922)
- The Bridges of Madison County (1995)
- The Bridge of San Luis Rey (1929, 1944, 2004)
- The Bridge on the River Kwai (1957)
- Die Brücke ("German – The Bridge", 1959)
- Un pont entre deux rives (The Bridge) (1999)
- A Bridge Too Far (1977)
- The Bridge at Remagen (1969)

== Songs ==
- The 1970 Simon and Garfunkel song (using the term metaphorically), "Bridge Over Troubled Water".
- The 1967 song "Ode to Billie Joe", which became a hit for Bobbie Gentry
- The Divine Comedy's "Painting the Forth Bridge", the title being a colloquial term for an unending task, a reference to the Forth Bridge
- The Pogues' "Misty Morning, Albert Bridge": Albert Bridge is a bridge across the Thames river
- MC Frontalot's song "Floating Bridge" is literally about different types of bridges.
- Andy Partridge (of XTC) and Harold Budd – "Tenochtitlan's Numberless Bridges": Tenochtitlan was an Aztec island city with many waterways, canals, and bridges
- Harpers Bizarre – "The 59th Street Bridge Song (Feelin' Groovy)": The bridge of the title, also known as the Queensboro Bridge, links Manhattan with Queens
- T'Pau – "Bridge of Spies": The title refers to Glienicke Bridge in Germany, called the Bridge of Spies because three times during the Cold War, released agents were exchanged there.

== Other works ==
- Iain Banks' 1986 novel The Bridge
- Ernest Hemingway's 1940 novel For Whom the Bell Tolls, concerning the destruction of a bridge by guerrillas during the Spanish Civil War
- Bridges TV cable TV station seeking to "bridge" Middle East and West.
- In Chinese and other East Asian ivory carvings the arch of the tusk with the central portion upward suggests naturally a bridge, and often a bridge is a central cultural element when a large sculpture is formed from a single tusk.

== Paintings ==
- Canaletto – various bridges in London and Venice, including the Rialto Bridge
- Hiroshige – various bridges in Japan, including several stations on the Tōkaidō road
- Hokusai – various bridges in Japan, including the color print series Views of Famous Bridges and Views of Lu-chu Islands
- Leonardo da Vinci – bridge in background in the Mona Lisa
- Claude Monet – Waterloo Bridge, Westminster Bridge, and in his Water Lilies paintings
- Camille Pissarro – various bridges in Paris, including "le Pont Neuf"
- J. M. W. Turner – bridges in Venice, England and Scotland, including the famous Rain, Steam and Speed – The Great Western Railway
- Vincent van Gogh – including "le Pont de la Grande Jatte" over the Seine
- James Abbott McNeill Whistler – his Nocturne in Black and Gold: The Falling Rocket depicts fireworks over old Battersea Bridge, London
- Camille Pissarro - his Pont Boieldieu in Rouen, Rainy Weather is one of a series of paintings Pissarro did of the Pont Boïeldieu and the industrial quays surrounding it

== Homes to sculpture and other art ==
Bridges are often used as locations for sculptures. Especially popular are animals such as lions, perhaps serving as guardians. Examples are the 485 carved stone lions of the Marco Polo Bridge in China, which was first constructed in 1192, and the four Centre Street Bridge lions of Calgary, which date to 1917.

Another well-known example of a bridge hosting statues is the Charles Bridge in Prague, which is home to 30 statues and statuaries, mostly baroque, dating to around 1700.

An example of a bridge graced with extensive mosaic art is the Larry Monroe Forever Bridge in Austin, Texas.

== See also ==
- Trains in art

=== References ===
- Opanuku Art Bridge
