= Saint-Lazare station (disambiguation) =

Saint-Lazare station could refer to:

- Gare Saint-Lazare, one of the principal railway stations in Paris, France
- Saint-Lazare station (Paris Metro), a metro station in Paris
- Haussmann–Saint-Lazare station, a rapid transit station in Paris
- Gare Saint-Lazare (Monet series), a series of paintings by Claude Monet
