= J. Craig Thorpe =

American artist

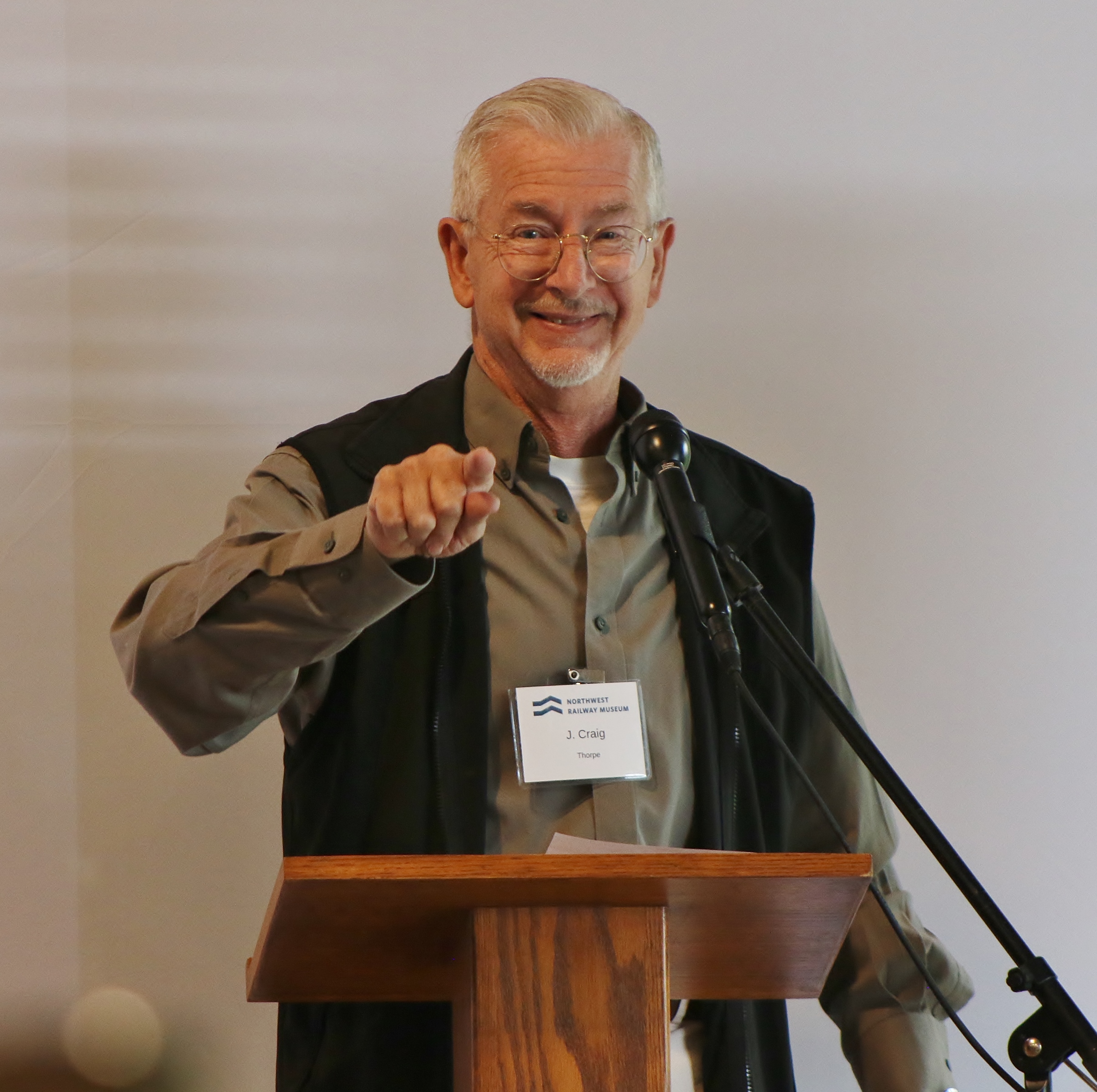
- Thorpe at the Northwest Railway Museum in 2026
- Education: Carnegie Mellon University
- Known for: Train paintings

J. Craig Thorpe (born 1948) is a modern American commercial and landscape artist. Much of his work depicts trains and the rail transport industry in the Western United States and Alaska. He has advocated greater use of rail transport, especially in contrast with automobiles, and has served as a director of the rail advocacy group All Aboard Washington. Thorpe was commissioned to paint an image celebrating the 2006 centennial of King Street Station in Seattle, Washington.

A native of Pittsburgh, Thorpe graduated from Carnegie Mellon University with a design degree and initially worked on architectural renderings. He switched to railroad and landscape art after a commissioned work to depict the then-proposed Centennial Station in Lacey, Washington, was featured in an Amtrak calendar. Thorpe has since been commissioned directly by Amtrak, as well as BNSF Railway, GE Transportation, and other railroads and museums. Thorpe was also an advocate for the Issaquah Valley Trolley. He resides in the Seattle area.

== See also ==
- Trains in art
