= Trains in art =

Topic in art

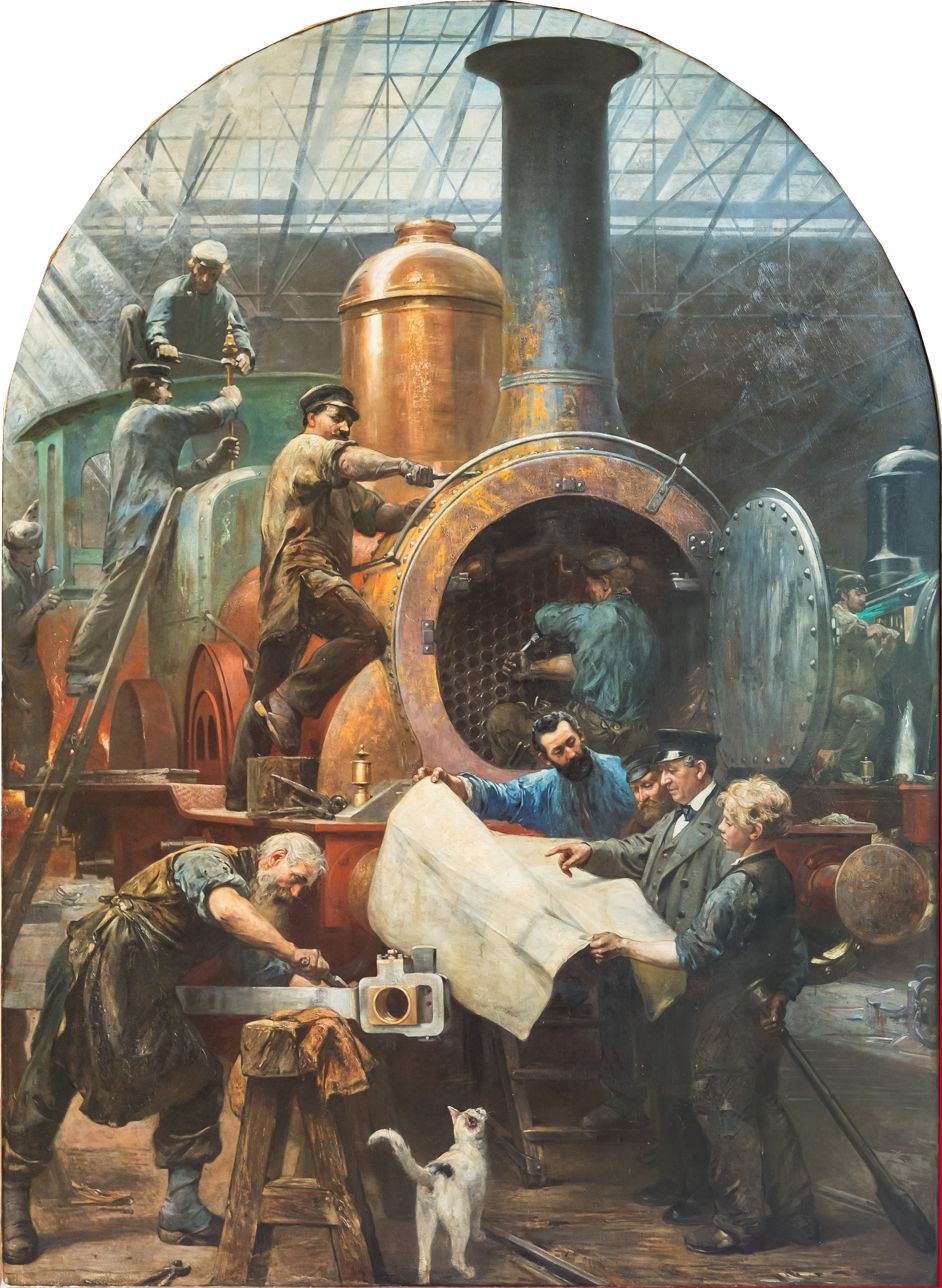
Vor der Vollendung (Before the Completion), 1873-1876, by Paul Friedrich Meyerheim

Trains in art refers to the depiction of locomotives and trains as subjects in the visual arts, literature, film, and music. Trains have appeared in painting, sculpture, and photography since the early days of the Industrial Revolution, reflecting the cultural and technological significance of rail transport. Artists have used trains as primary subjects, as elements of landscape and urban scenes, and as metaphors for power, movement, and modernity. Notable works span from the mid-19th century, when railways first transformed societies, through the Machine Age of the early 20th century and beyond.

== Criteria ==
A locomotive or train can play many roles in art, for example:

- As the main subject of a painting, sculpture, or photograph
- As a work of art in itself in addition to most functional considerations, especially in streamlined steam locomotives and luxury passenger accommodations of the early 20th century, known also as the Machine Age
- As a subject for a novel or film
- As a metaphor in song or poetry, particularly for physical power or directed movement (physical, romantic (phallic) or other), as in Fisherman's Blues:

"I wish I was the brakeman
on a hurtling, fevered train
crashing headlong into the heartland
like a cannon in the rain"

In 1978, the Centre Georges Pompidou in Paris held the exhibition "Les Temps des Gares" with the Palais des Beaux-Arts in Brussels, the National Railway Museum in York, and the Leonardo da Vinci Museum of Science and Technology in Milan.

In 2008, Liverpool's Walker Art Gallery held an exhibition entitled: "Art in the Age of Steam."

== Trains in specific artworks ==
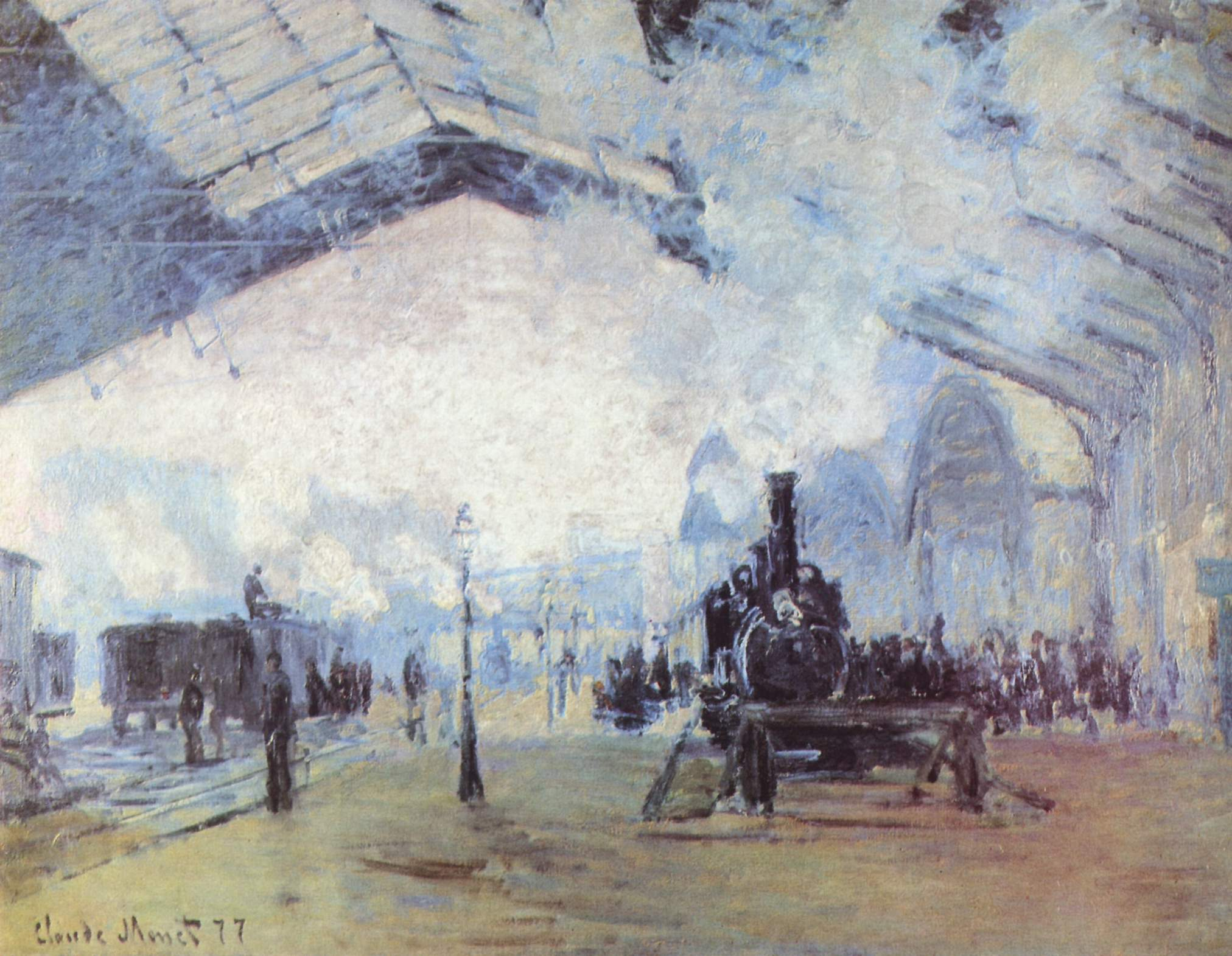
Arrival of the Normandy Train, Gare Saint-Lazare, c. 1877 by Claude Monet

The following list is in chronological order, oldest to youngest:

- Rain, Steam and Speed – The Great Western Railway, by J. M. W. Turner, 1844
- The Berlin-Potsdam Railway, by Adolph von Menzel, 1847
- Gnome Watching Railway Train, by Carl Spitzweg, 1848
- The Lackawanna Valley, by George Inness, 1855
- The Railway Station, by William Powell Frith, 1862
- The Travelling Companions, by Augustus Egg, 1862
- Lordship Lane Station, by Camille Pissarro, 1871
- The Railway, by Édouard Manet, 1872
- Arrival of the Normandy Train, Gare Saint-Lazare, by Claude Monet, c. 1877
- Le Pont de l'Europe, by Gustave Caillebotte, 1880
- Mont Sainte-Victoire and the Viaduct of the Arc River Valley, by Paul Cézanne, 1882–1885
- The Lineman, by L. A. Ring, 1884
- Landscape with a Carriage and a Train, by Vincent van Gogh, 1890
- States of Mind I:The Farewells, by Umberto Boccioni, 1911
- The Anxious Journey, by Giorgio de Chirico, 1913
- Railroad Sunset, by Edward Hopper, 1929
- Train in the Station, by Raoul Dufy, 1935
- Time Transfixed, by René Magritte, 1938
- Rolling Power, by Charles Sheeler, 1939
- The Migration Series, Panel 5: "Migrants were advanced passage on the railroads, paid for by northern industry. Northern industry was to be repaid by the migrants out of their future wages", by Jacob Lawrence, 1941–42
- The Race, by Thomas Hart Benton, 1942
- Night Train (1947), Train in Evening (1957), Station in the Forest (1960) and The Sacrifice of Iphigenia (1968), by Paul Delvaux
- Horse and Train, by Alex Colville, 1954
- Chair Car, by Edward Hopper, 1965
- The Sources of Country Music, by Thomas Hart Benton, 1975
- Autumn of Steam, by Terence Cuneo, 1979
- Jim Beam - J.B. Turner Train, by Jeff Koons, 1986
- Brick Train, by David Mach, 1997

== Artists specialising in trains ==
In the United Kingdom the Guild of Railway Artists is a group of painters of railway subjects.

== See also ==
- Bridges in art
- Landscape art
- Marine art
