= Arrival of the Normandy Train, Gare Saint-Lazare =

1877 painting by Claude Monet

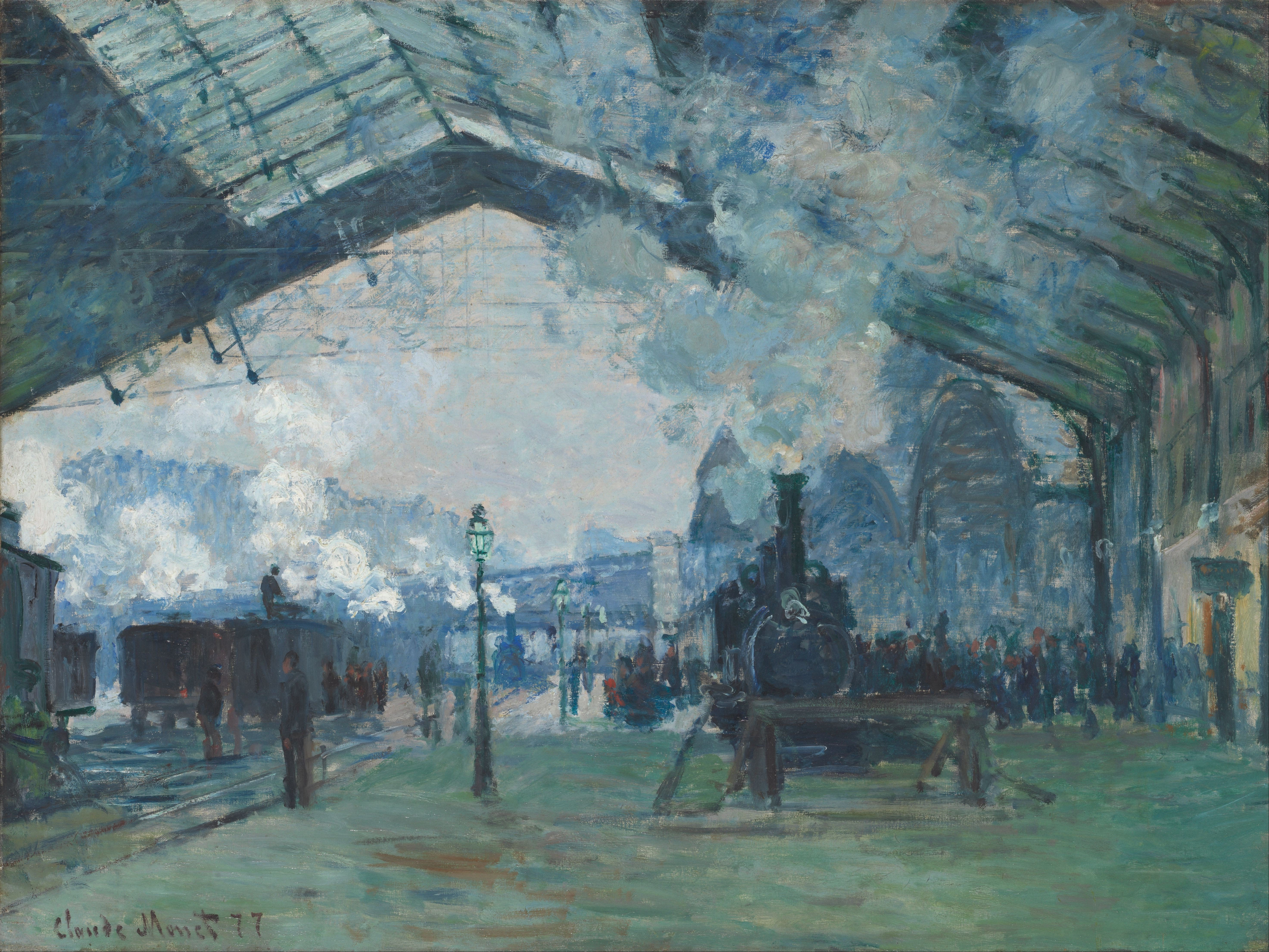
- Artist: Claude Monet
- Medium: Oil on canvas
- Dimensions: 80.2 cm × 59.6 cm (31.6 in × 23.5 in)
- Location: Art Institute of Chicago

Arrival of the Normandy Train, Gare Saint-Lazare, also known as The Railway Station of Saint Lazare in Paris, is a c. 1877 oil-on-canvas painting by Claude Monet. It is in the permanent collection of the Art Institute of Chicago.

The Impressionist painting depicts a steam train from Normandy arriving at the Gare Saint-Lazare railway station in Paris, with crowds of people waiting amid the steam and smoke under the vaulted iron and glass vault of the station's train shed. It was painted en plein air, at the station. It measures 60.3 cm × 80.2 cm (23.7 in × 31.6 in) and is signed and dated in the lower left corner, "Claude Monet 77".

The painting is one of 12 works by Monet depicting a scene at the station, and it was also one of eight that he exhibited at the Third Impressionist Exhibition in Paris in April 1877. It was sold to Ernest Hoschedé in March 1877, but was in the possession of Georges de Bellio the following year. On his death in 1894, it was inherited by de Bellio's daughter Victorine and her husband Ernest Donop de Monchy. Sold to the Bernheim-Jeune gallery around 1899, it passed through the hands of the art dealer Paul Rosenberg and then the Durand-Ruel gallery in Paris in 1911, which took the painting to New York. It was sold later in 1911 to the wealthy industrialist and art collector Martin A. Ryerson for US$7,000. On his death in 1932, it was bequeathed to the Art Institute of Chicago.

== Gallery ==
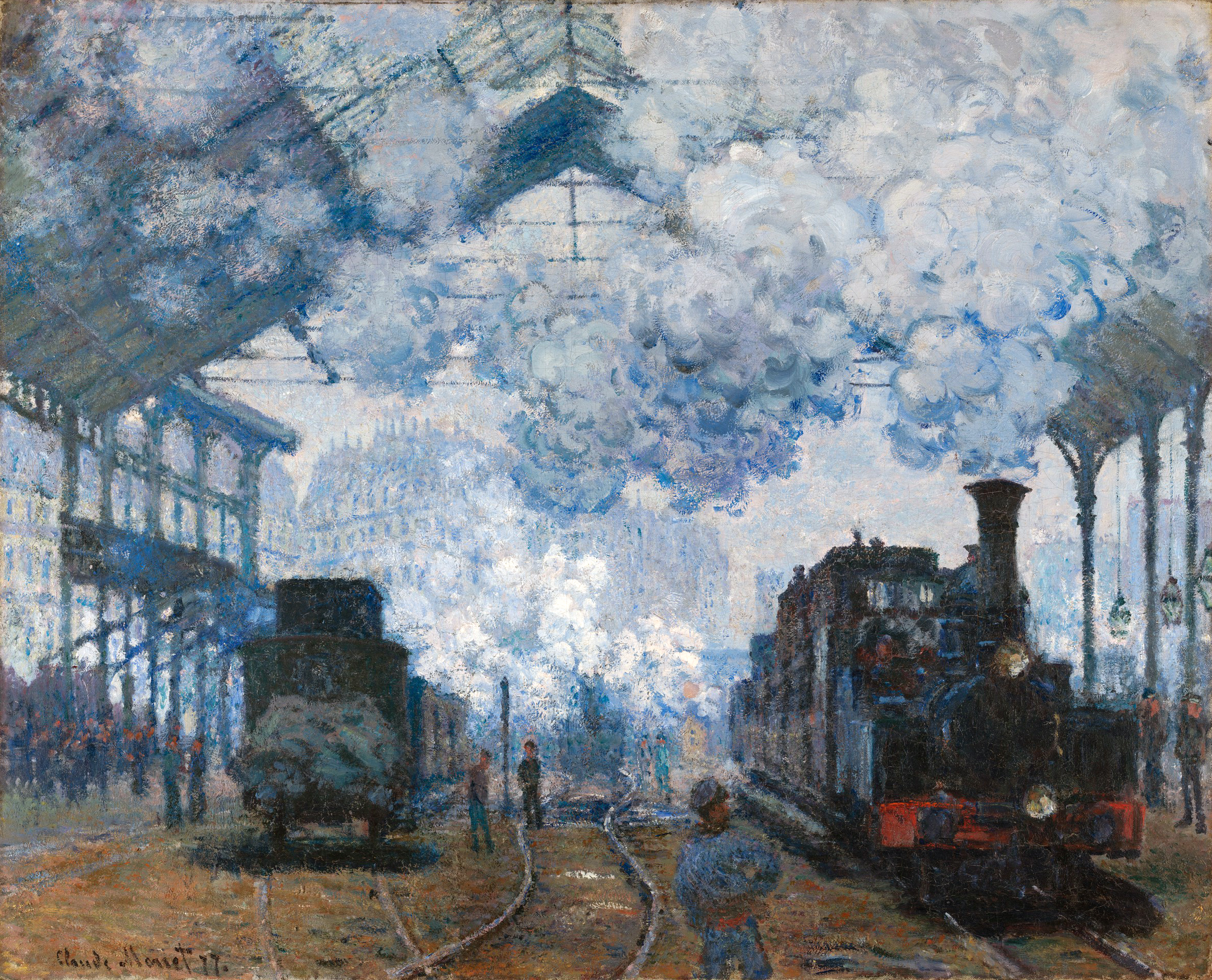
Claude Monet: Gare Saint-Lazare, l'arrivée d'un train, 1877, Fogg Art Museum

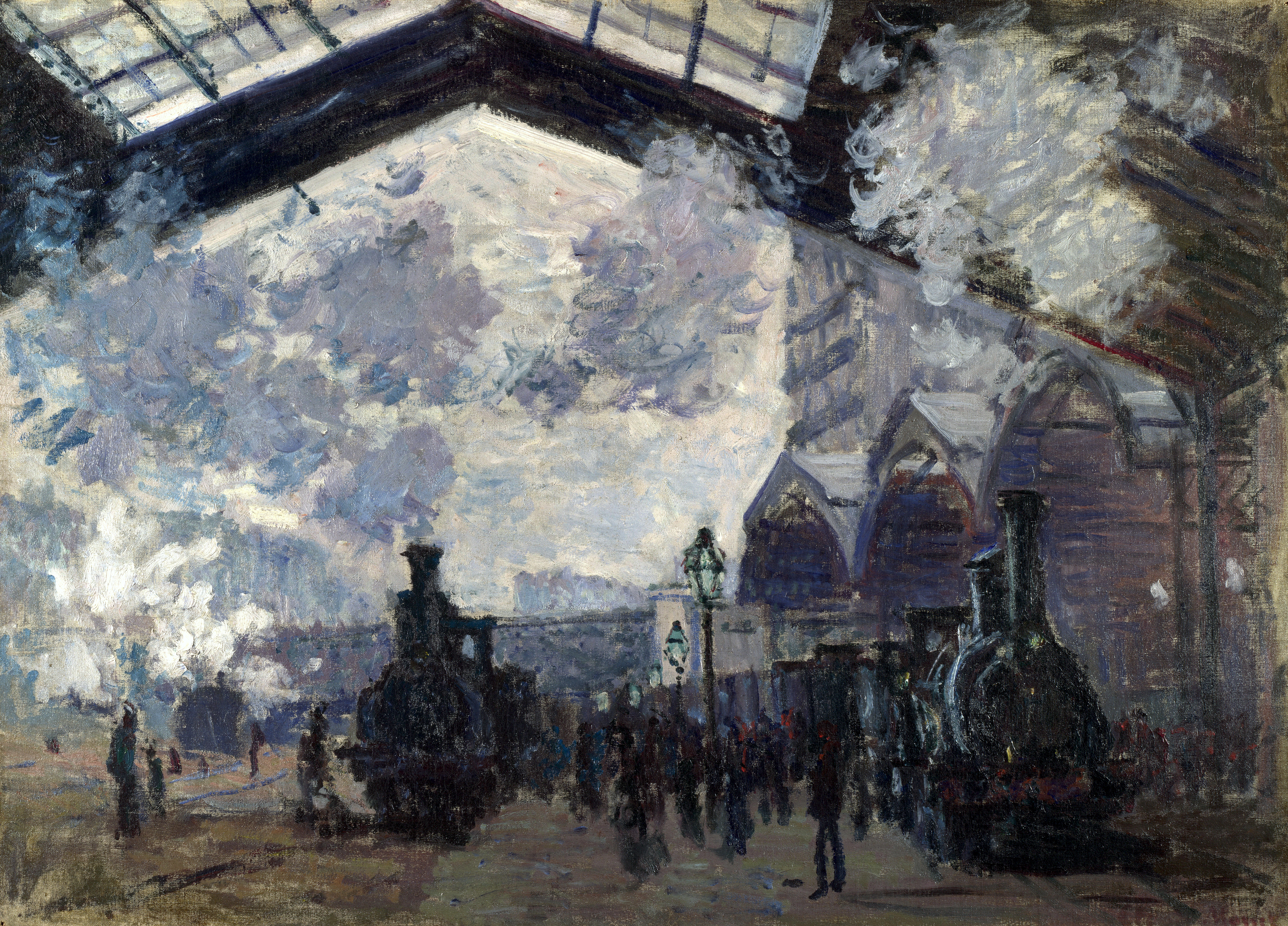
Claude Monet: Gare Saint-Lazare, 1877, National Gallery

== See also ==
- List of paintings by Claude Monet
- Gare Saint-Lazare (Monet series)
