= Depictions of the sacrifice of Iphigenia =

Greek mythological event depictions

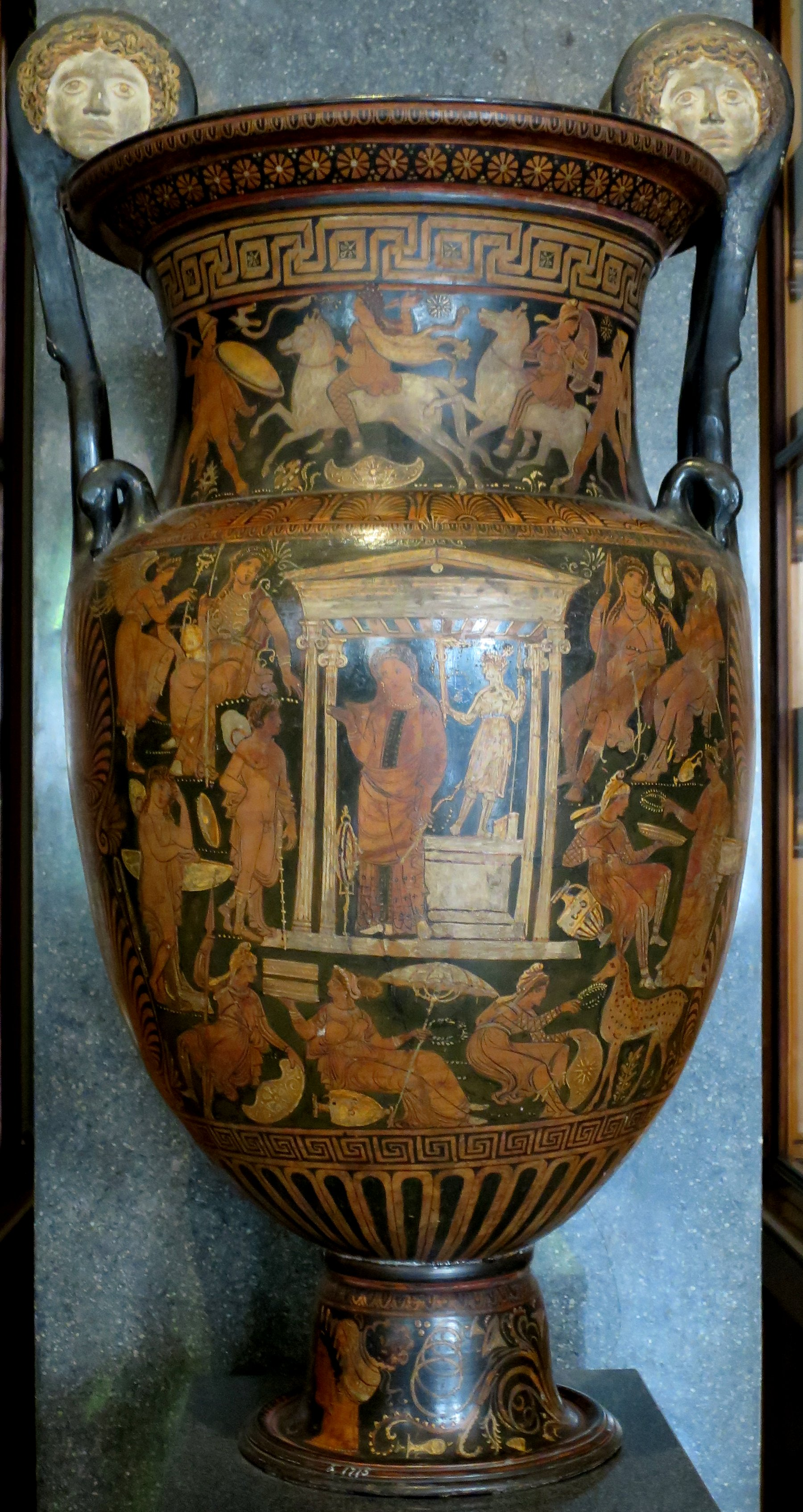
Amphora depicting the abduction of Iphigenia by Artemis

Iphigenia was the daughter of Agamemnon and Clytemnestra. According to the story, Agamemnon committed a mistake and had to sacrifice Iphigenia to Artemis to appease her. There are different versions of the story. According to one side of the story, before Agamemnon could sacrifice her, Artemis saved her and replaced her with a deer on the altar. In the other version, Agamemnon actually went through with the sacrifice. The different versions aid in the different depictions of Iphigenia.

The sacrifice of Iphigenia is immortalized on many different mediums. Vases are a common base for the story, but there are mosaics, paintings, and written works from every era illustrating the myth of Iphigenia. The most common scene depicted in the different visual media of Iphigenia is when she about to be offered up to Artemis on the altar.

== Lost artworks described in Ancient literature ==
=== Pausanias ===
Pausanias was a traveler who wrote the Description of Greece which depicted his accounts of what he has seen on mainland Greece. He recorded a few depictions of the death of Iphigenia. He mentions that the temple of Artemis was where the sacrifice was to take place. He goes on to describe the temple of Artemis after its destruction. Pausanias then gives an example of an artistic depiction of Iphigenia that was found in Catalonia. In the mosaic, Iphigenia is being led to the altar and it is seen that Artemis is in the back waiting and holding a deer to replace Iphigenia with.

=== Pliny the Elder ===
Pliny the Elder was a Roman scholar who wrote about the great artists of Classical Antiquity in his encyclopedic work The Natural History. He describes a few paintings of Iphigenia which were famous in his era.

The Sacrifice of Iphigenia, by the painter Timanthes of the 4th century BC, was well-known for depicting her father Agamemnon veiling himself in grief. A fresco from Pompeii is believed to be a loose adaptation of this painting.

Iphigenia among the Taurians was painted by Timomachus, a painter of the 1st century BC whose work was renowned around the time of Julius Caesar. A number of Pompeian frescoes are believed to be adaptations of this painting.

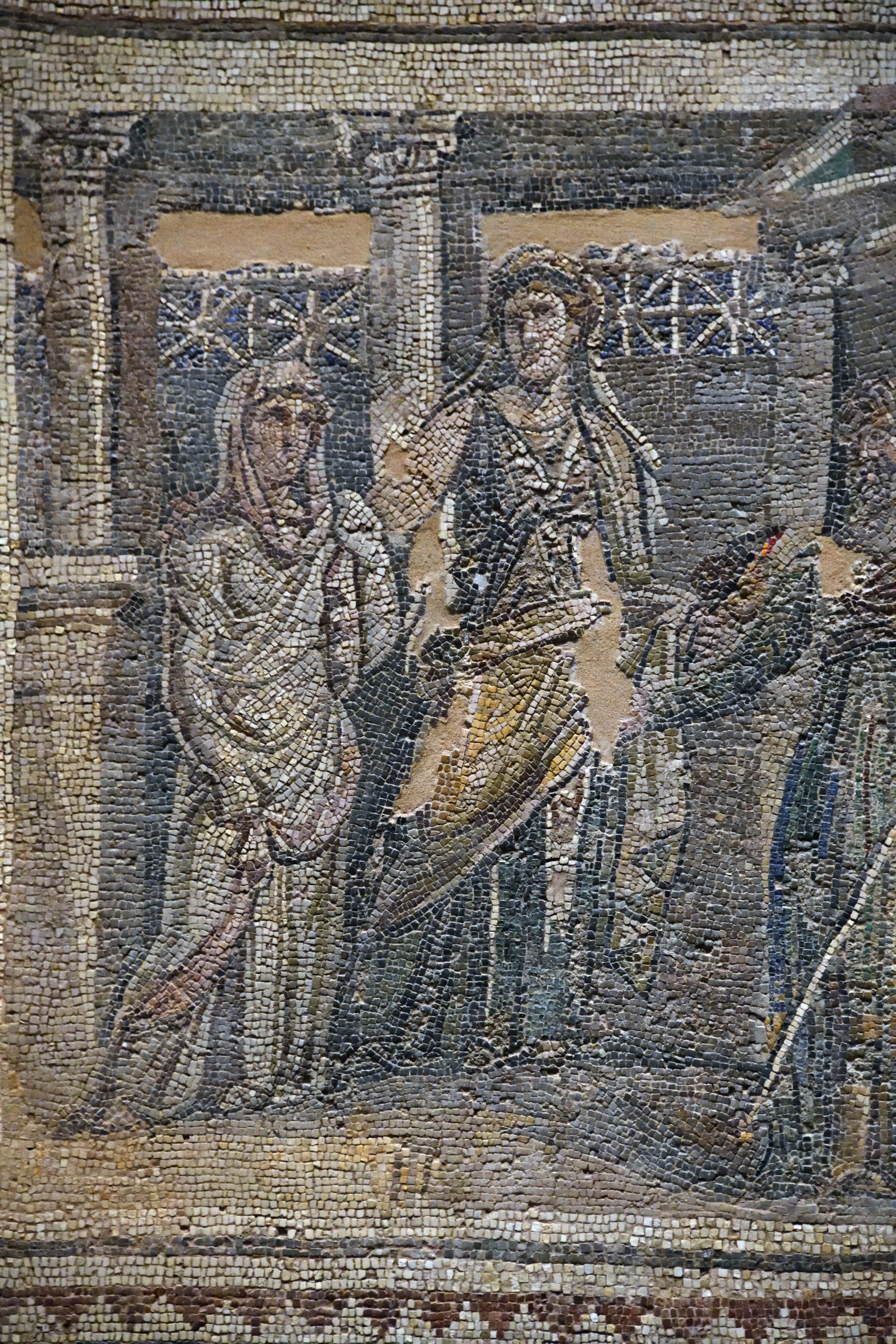
Mosaic of Iphigenia in Aulis in the Antakya Mosaic Museum. 5th century AD

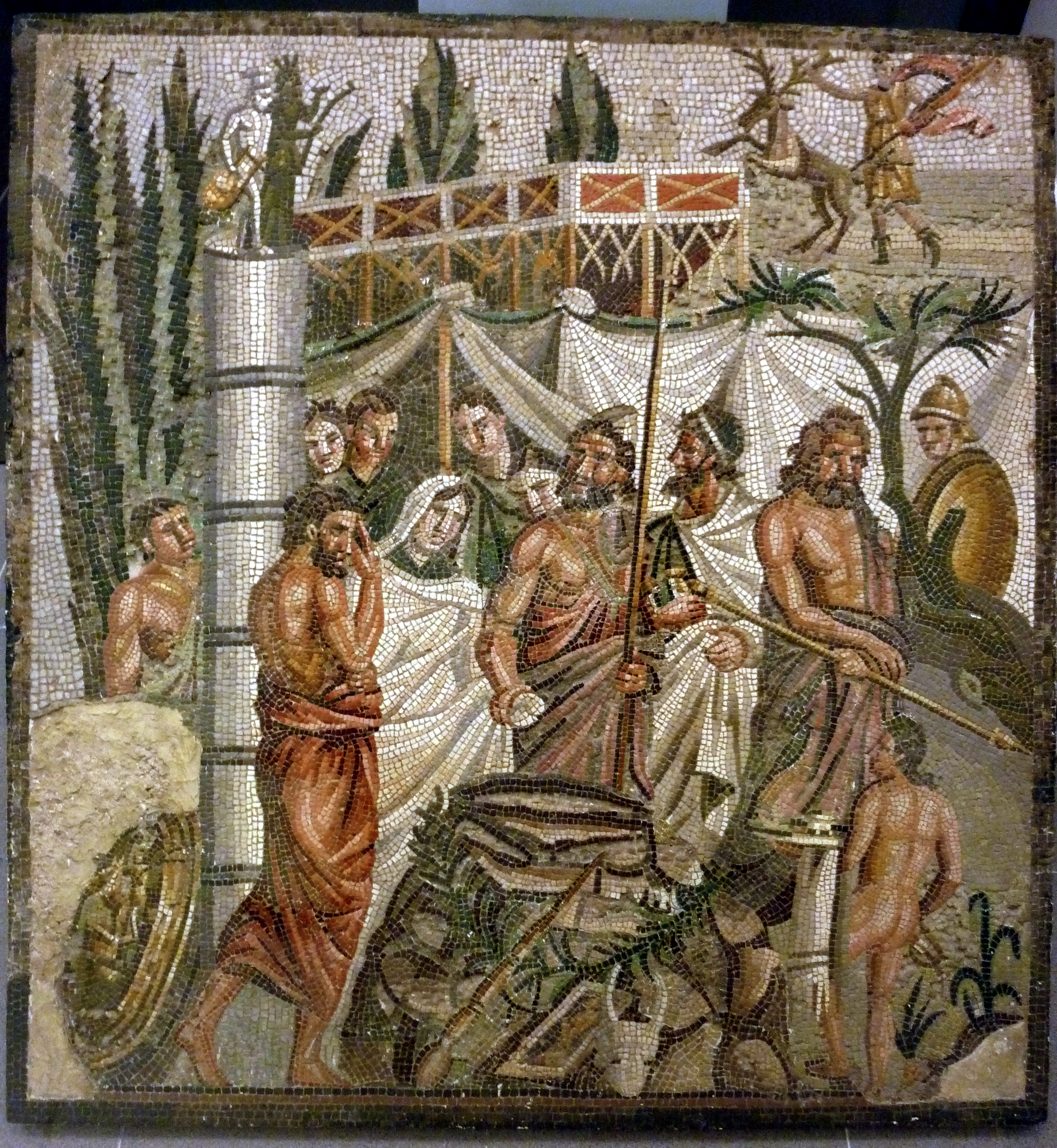
Roman mosaic of the Sacrifice of Iphigenia found in Empúries, Spain. 1st century AD

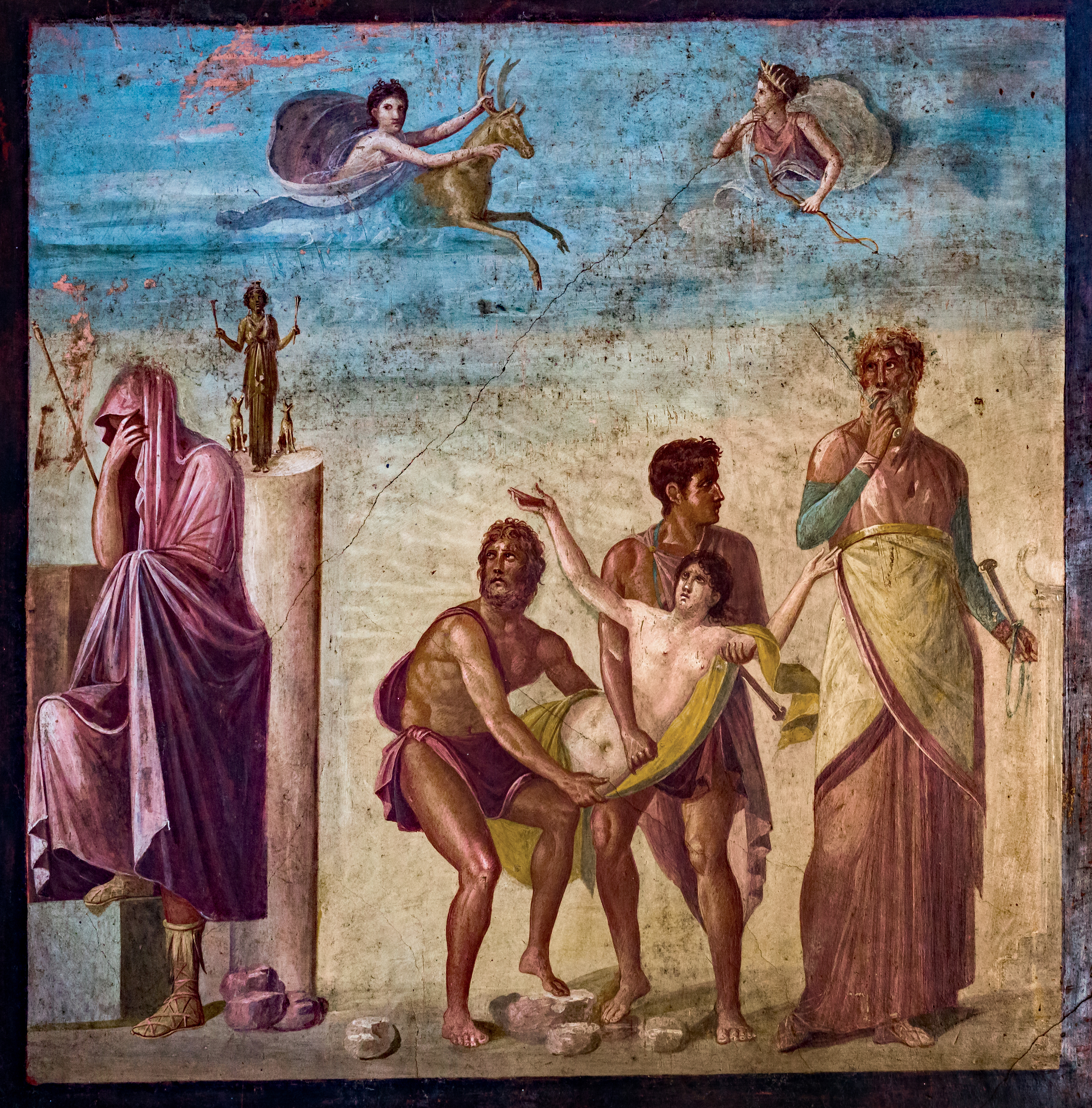
Pompeian fresco believed to be a loose copy of Timanthes' Sacrifice of Iphigenia

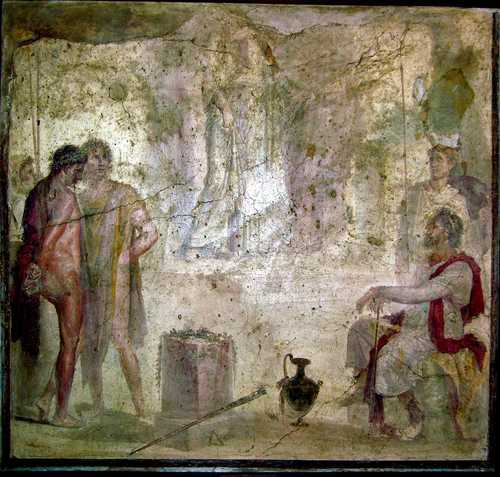
Pompeian fresco believed to be a loose copy of Timomachus' Iphigenia in Tauris

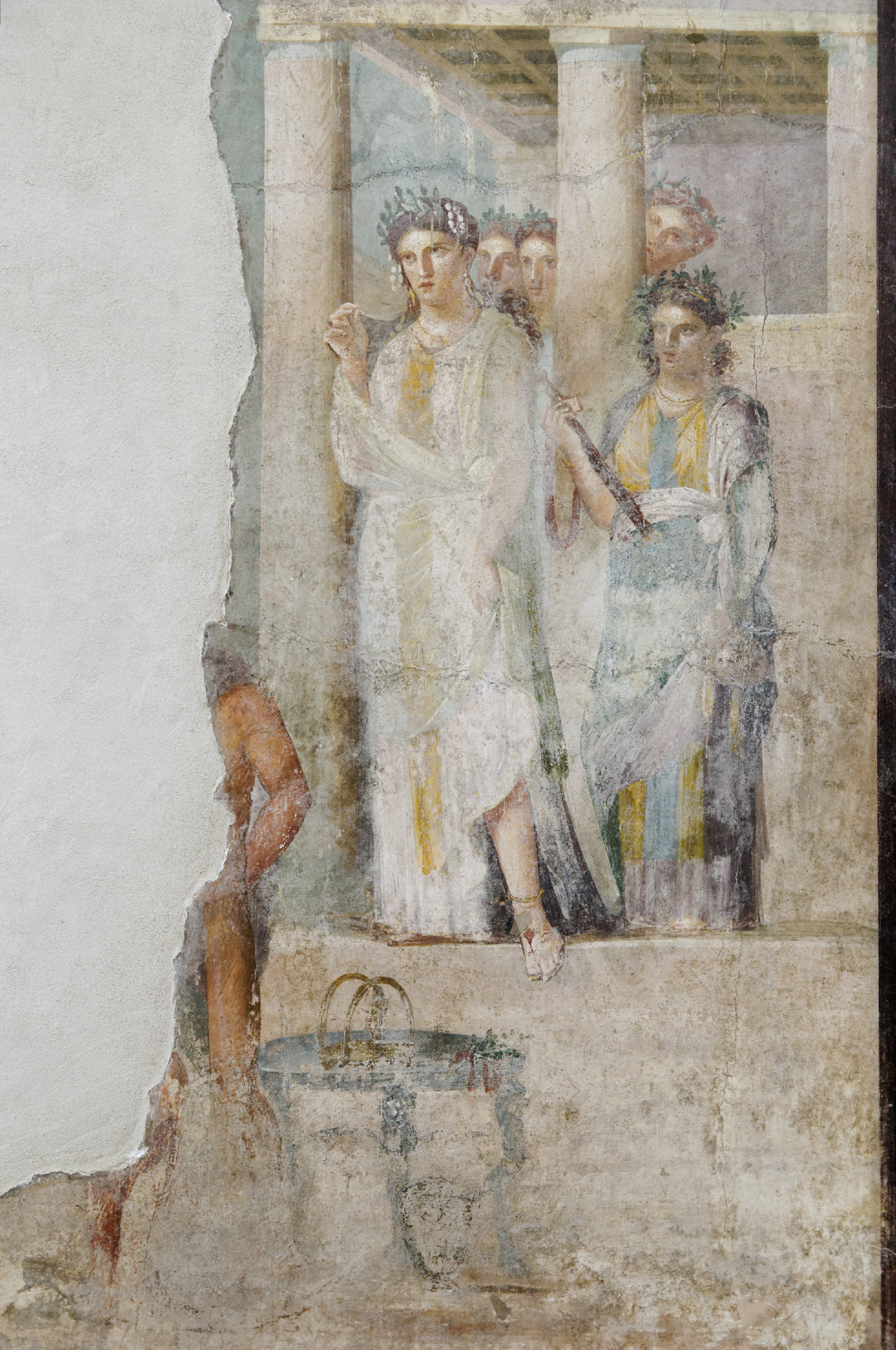
Another Pompeian fresco of Timomachus' painting

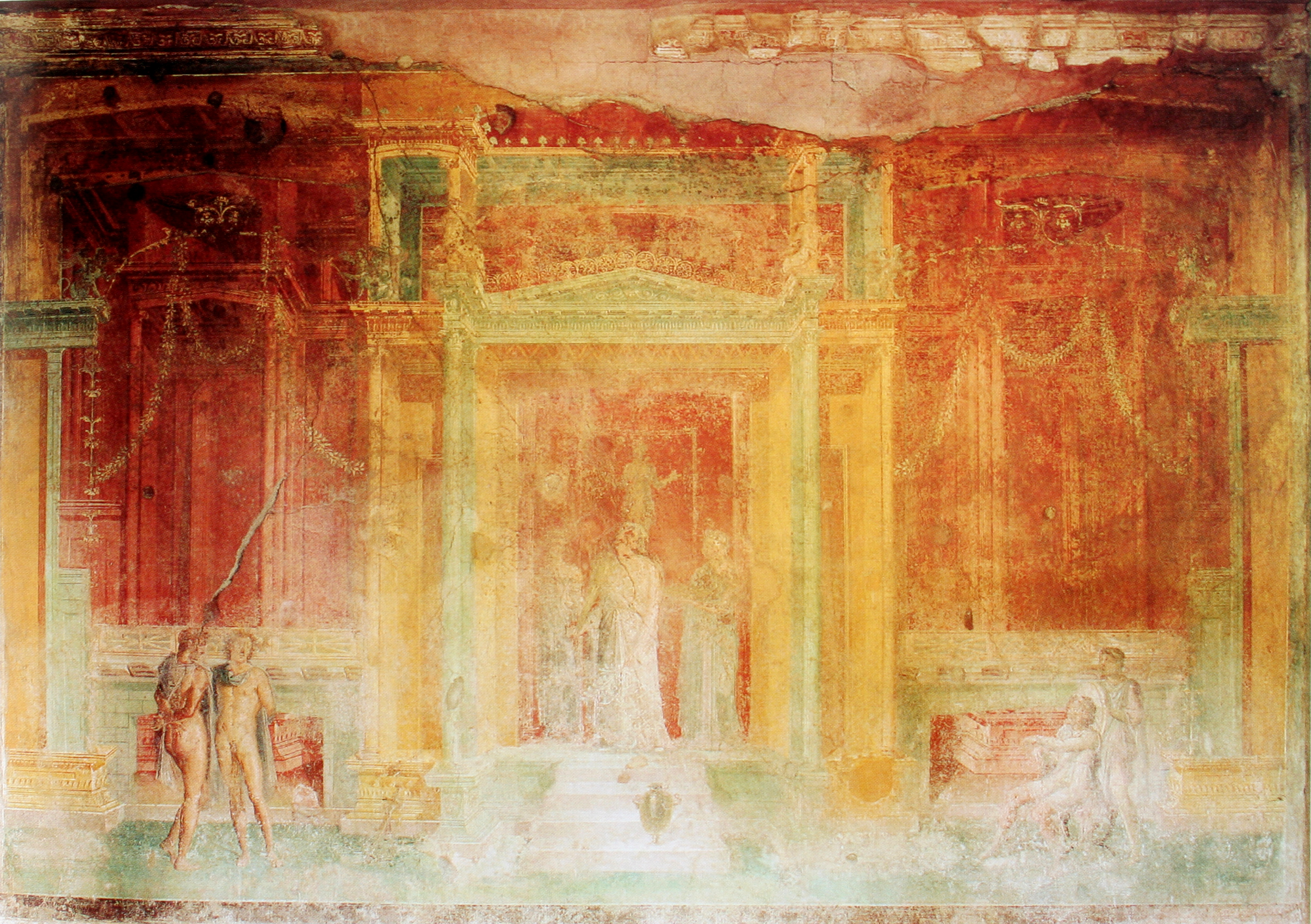
A Pompeian Wall-mural adapting Timomachus' painting as a theatrical play

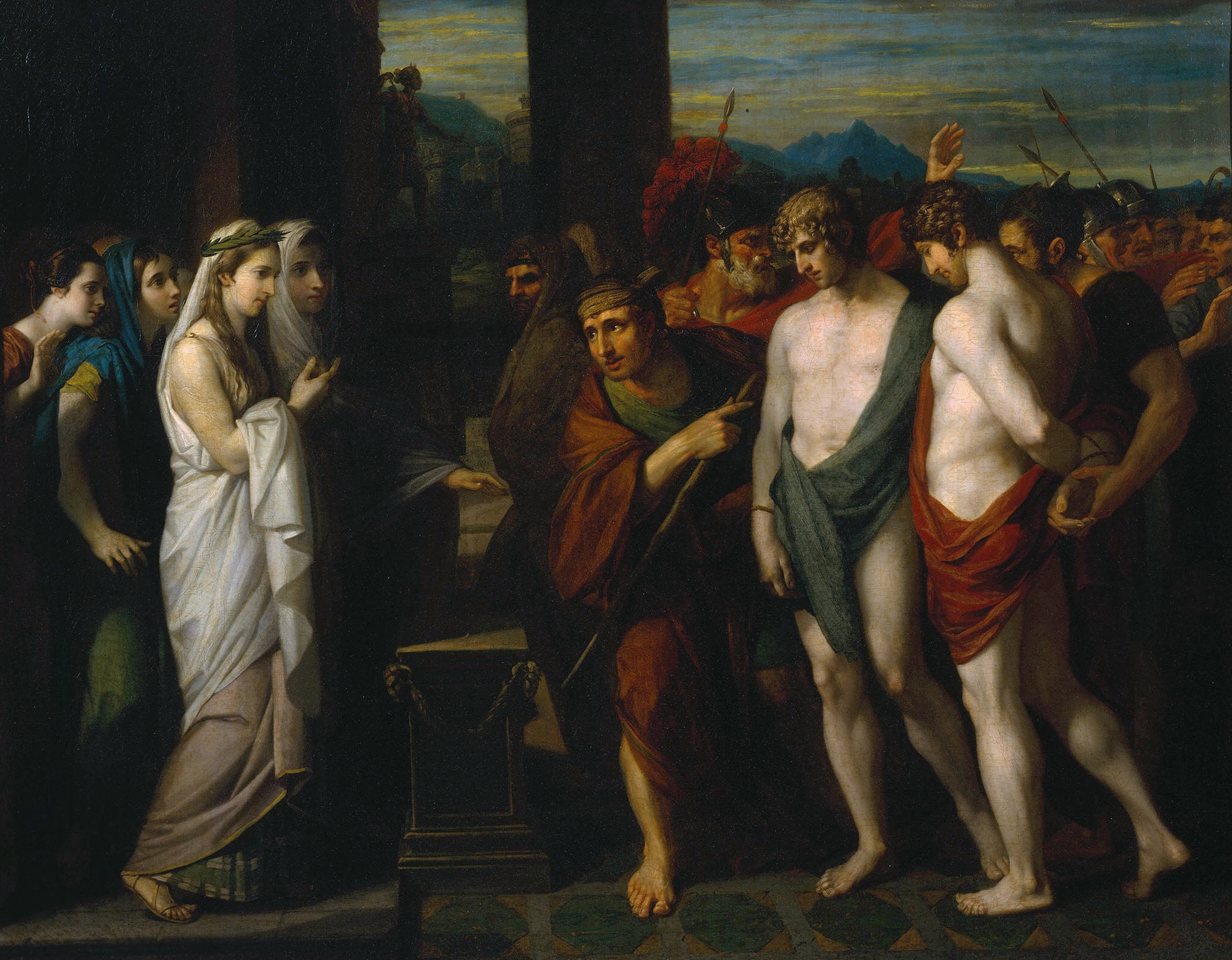
Pylades and Orestes Brought as Victims before Iphigenia by Benjamin West, 1766

== Iphigenia in art ==
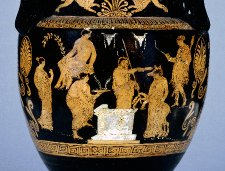
Volute Krater of Iphigenia's Sacrifice

=== Volute krater of the sacrifice ===
There are several vases that were made and decorated with illustrations of the sacrifice of Iphigenia. The volute krater shown was made in Apulia around 370–350 BC. It is in the red-figure technique. Here the sacrifice is about to take place, with the altar depicted in white. Agamemnon is painted here with a knife in his hand, showing that he about to commit the sacrifice. Artemis and Apollo are also illustrated. Artemis is looking down upon Iphigenia and Apollo is seated on a rock to the left, looking back. Death is imminent because the offering is going to be made with an audience around.

=== Mosaic of Iphigenia ===
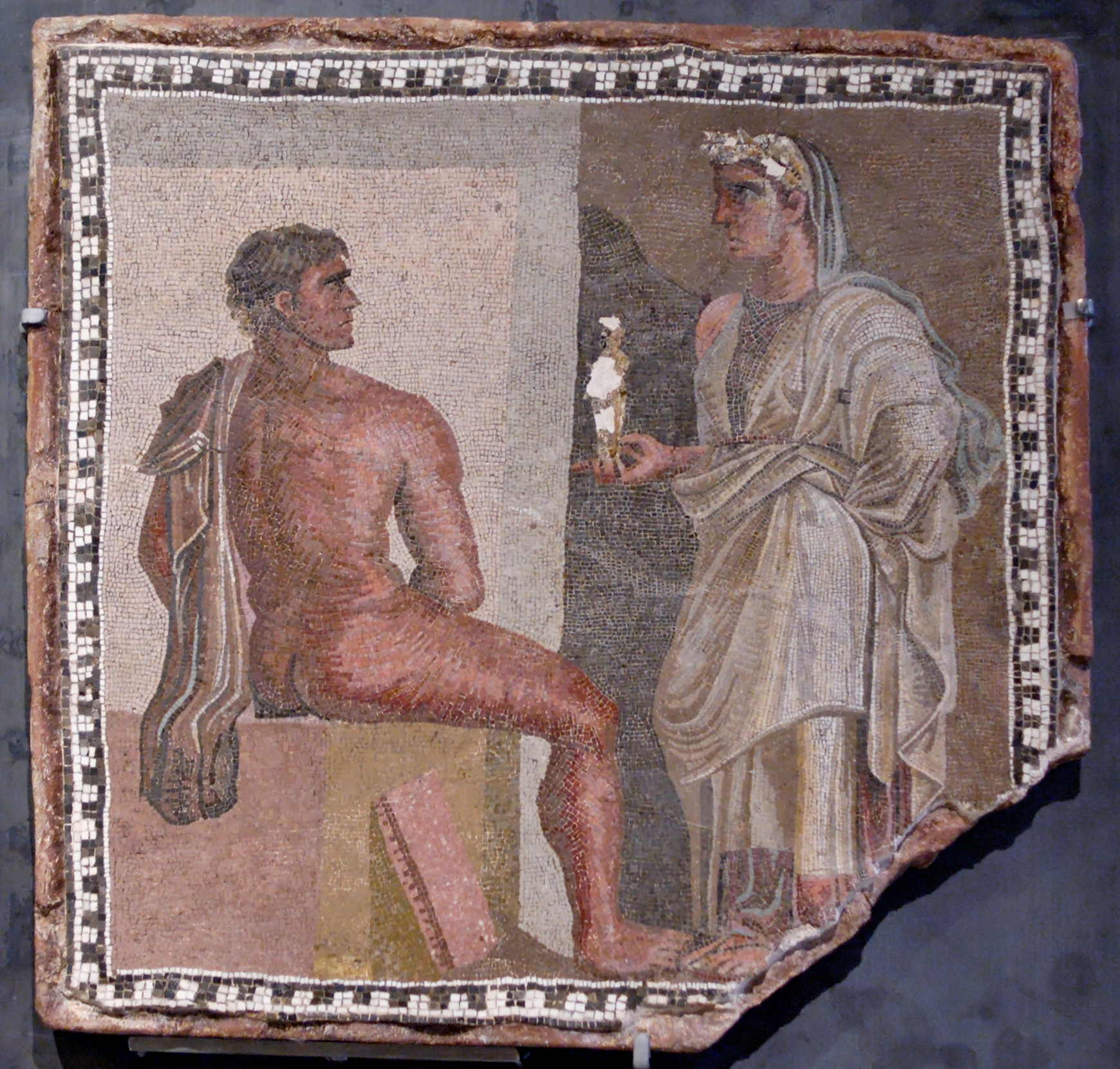
A mosaic depicting Iphigenia

Recently, a mosaic depicting Iphigenia was found in Perga, Turkey during an excavation by archaeologists. It is said to be about 1,800 years old. The mosaic shows Iphigenia during the Trojan War. It was concluded that the site was a cult area founded in the basement of a shop that could have existed during the days of Ancient Greece. In this depiction, Iphigenia is replaced by a deer, harrowingly missing death.

=== Iphigenia in Aulis ===
Iphigenia in Aulis is a play written by a Greek playwright Euripides. It revolves around Agamemnon's decision to sacrifice his daughter's life for Artemis. It is written through the eyes of Agamemnon. Death is a main theme in this play because of the Iphigenia's circumstance, but also because the Trojan war is on the cusp.

=== Iphigenia in Tauris ===
Iphigenia in Tauris is another play written by Euripides. In this telling of the tale, Iphigenia is not dead, and she meets with her brother. She is made a priestess in the temple of Artemis of the Taurians She recounts her story and tells how she arrived to the place by the hands of Artemis. Iphigenia conducts rites as a priestess to Artemis. Although, Iphigenia has eluded death in this play, it is still a theme and effects the tone because of it was the beginning of a domino effect for the play.

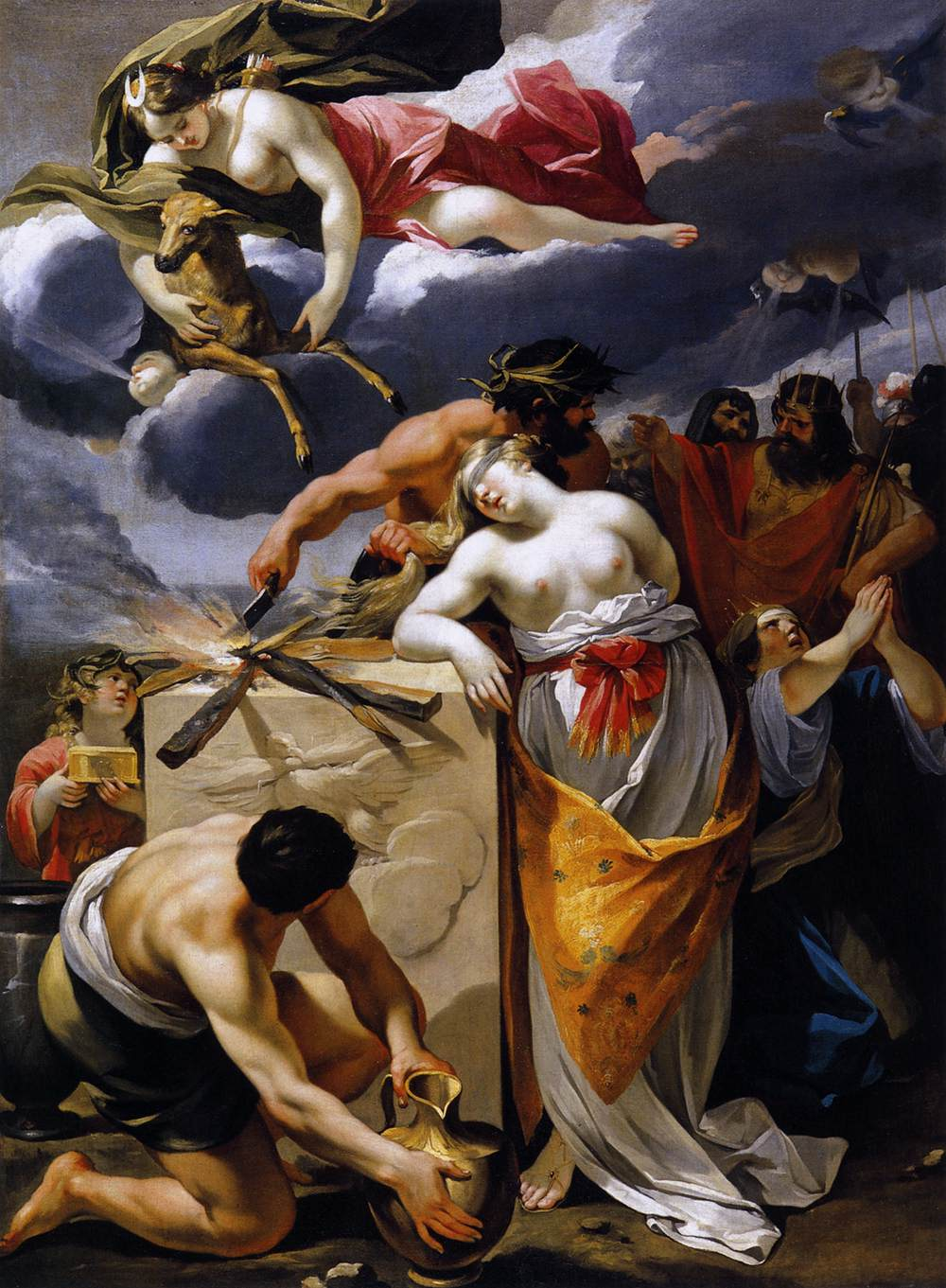
By Perrier (1632)

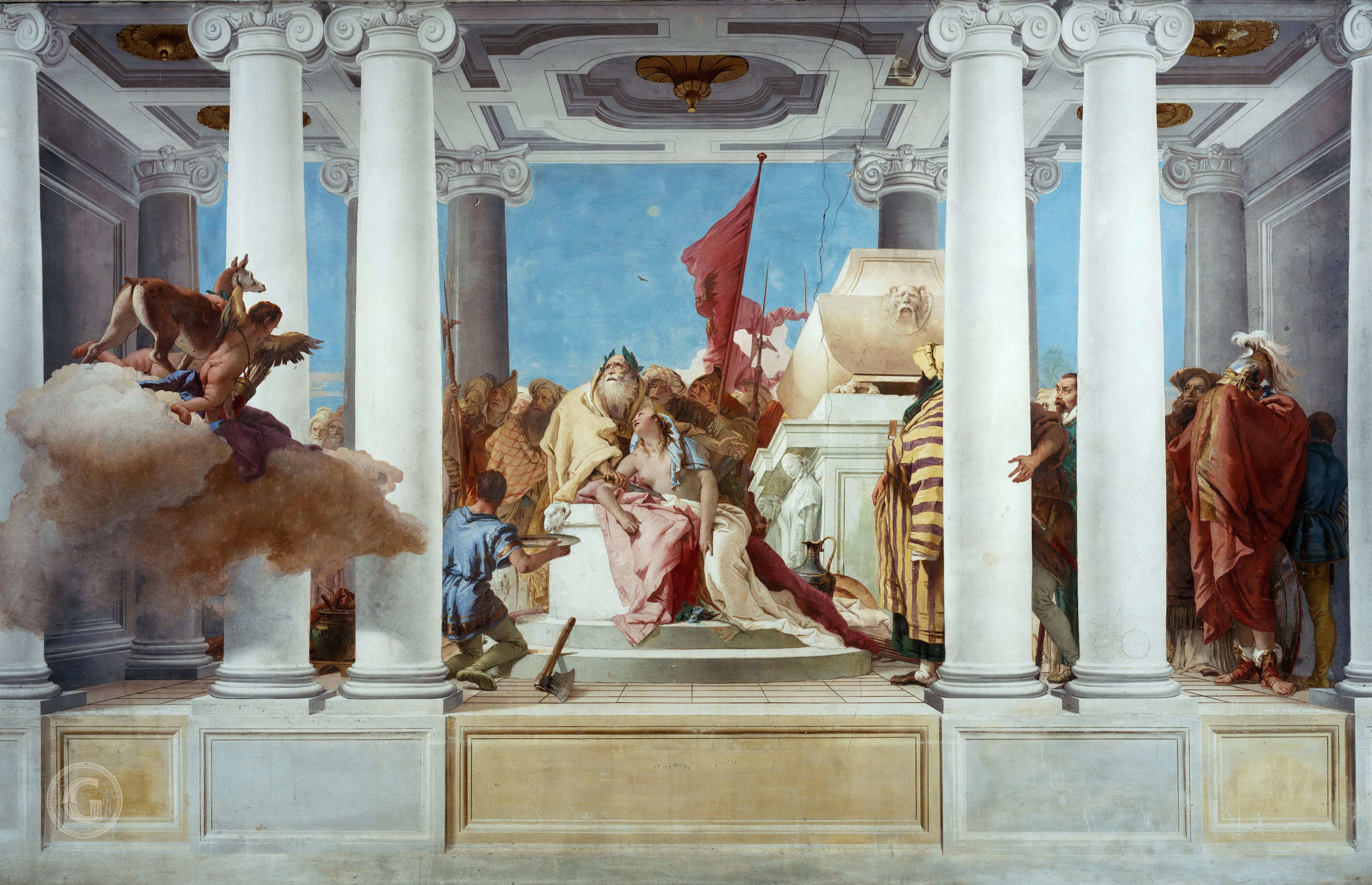
By Tiepolo (1757)

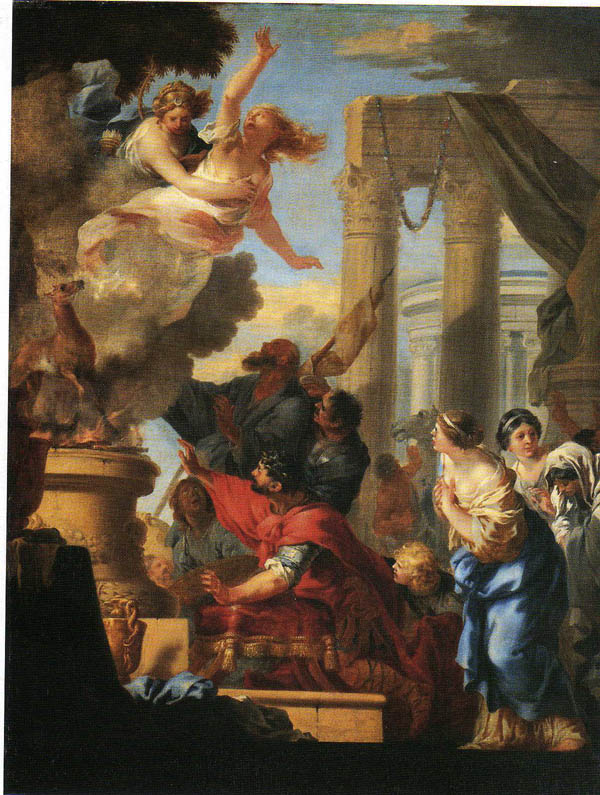
By Bourdon (1653)
