= Gare Saint-Lazare (Monet series) =

Series of oil paintings by Claude Monet

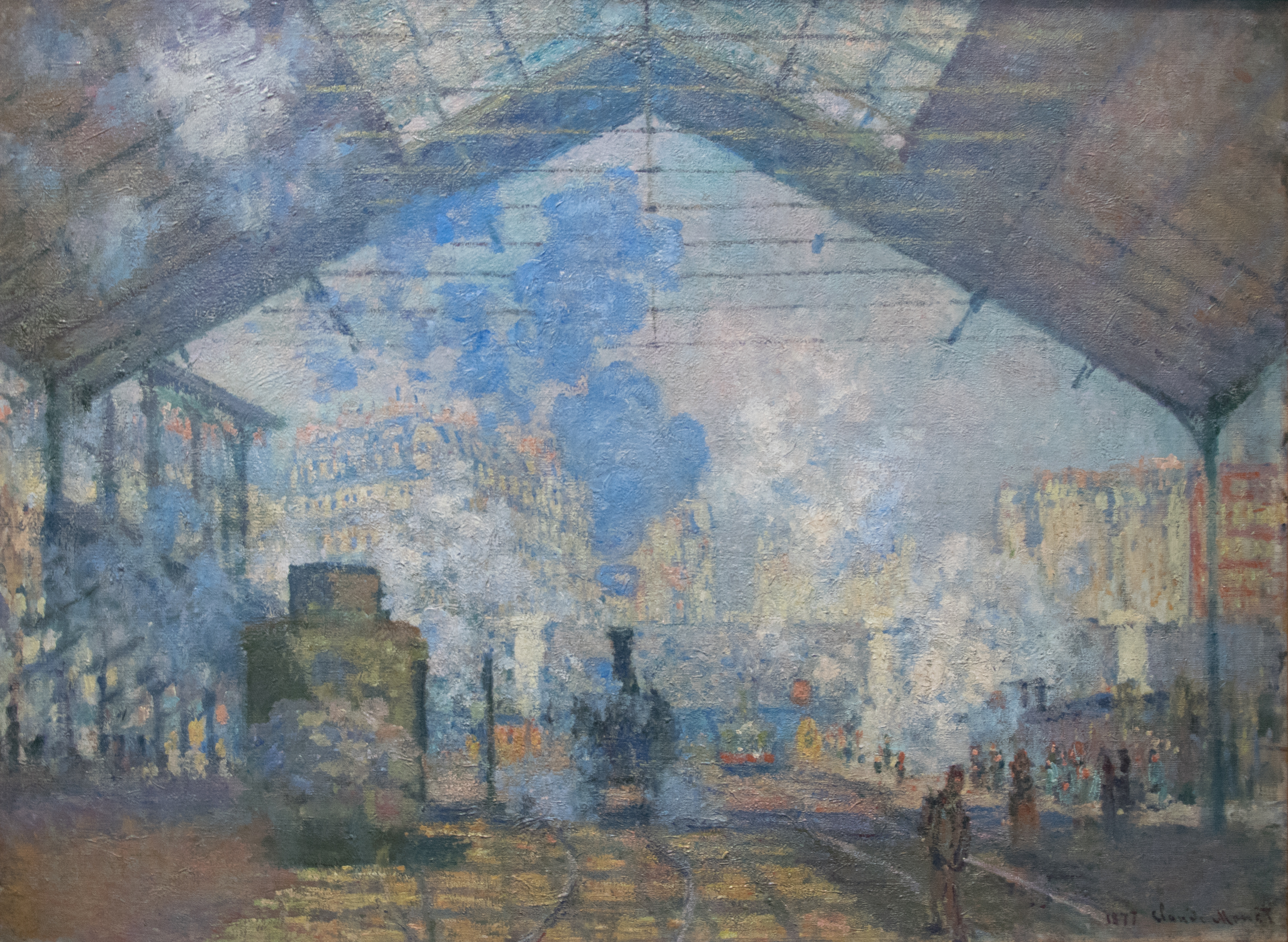
- La Gare Saint-Lazare
- Artist: Claude Monet
- Year: 1877
- Medium: Oil on canvas
- Dimensions: 75 cm × 105 cm (30 in × 41 in)
- Location: Musée d'Orsay, Paris, France

Gare Saint-Lazare is a series of oil paintings by the French artist Claude Monet. The paintings depict the smoky interior of the eponymous railway station in varied atmospheric conditions and from various points of view. The series contains twelve paintings, all created in 1877 in Paris. This was Monet's first series of paintings concentrating on a single theme.

This Impressionist series was deeply influenced by modernization and industrialization in the nineteenth century, presenting a busy train station in different times of a day. Monet finished the Gare Saint-Lazare series in the first half of 1877 and exhibited seven of the twelve paintings at the Third Impressionist Exhibition in the same year. Today, the Gare Saint-Lazare paintings are scattered in institutions all over the world, including Musée d'Orsay, Fogg Art Museum, Art Institute of Chicago, National Gallery, Musée Marmottan Monet, Pola Museum of Art, Lower Saxony State Museum, and other private collections.

== Background ==
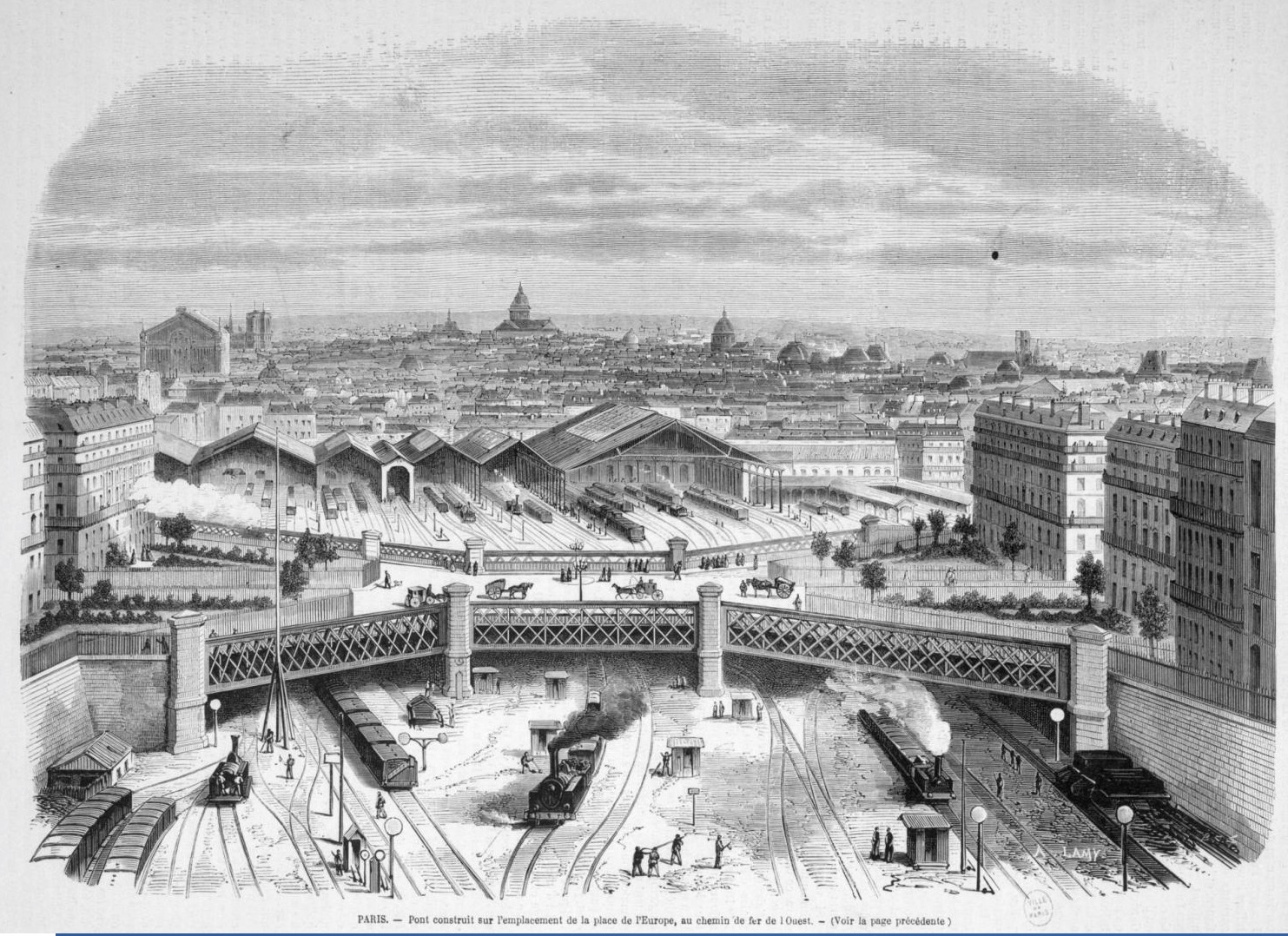
Illustration of the Gare Saint-Lazare in 1868

Saint-Lazare station is the terminus of the first railway in Paris and one of the six largest terminuses in Paris, which opened in 1837. During the 1850s and 1860s, the station had expanded at an exponential rate due to industrialization, and it attracted contemporary painters including Monet, Manet, and Caillebotte. In the 1870s, contemporary artists started to draw inspiration from trains, stations, and railways. One critic felt compelled to call the entire Impressionist movement “the School of the place de l’Europe,” which referred to Gare Saint-Lazare's square.

== Creation ==
In the 1870s, Monet rented a studio not far from the Gare Saint-Lazare and gained permission from the director of the Compagnie des Chemins de fer de l'Ouest to paint from the station concourse and beside the track.

Painting on site, Monet had to deal with the incoming and outgoing trains and crowds of passengers. When he sketched and started painting, his view must have been blocked by steam and smoke. In 1889, critic Hugues Le Roux recalled Monet's working process in the Gare Saint-Lazare:

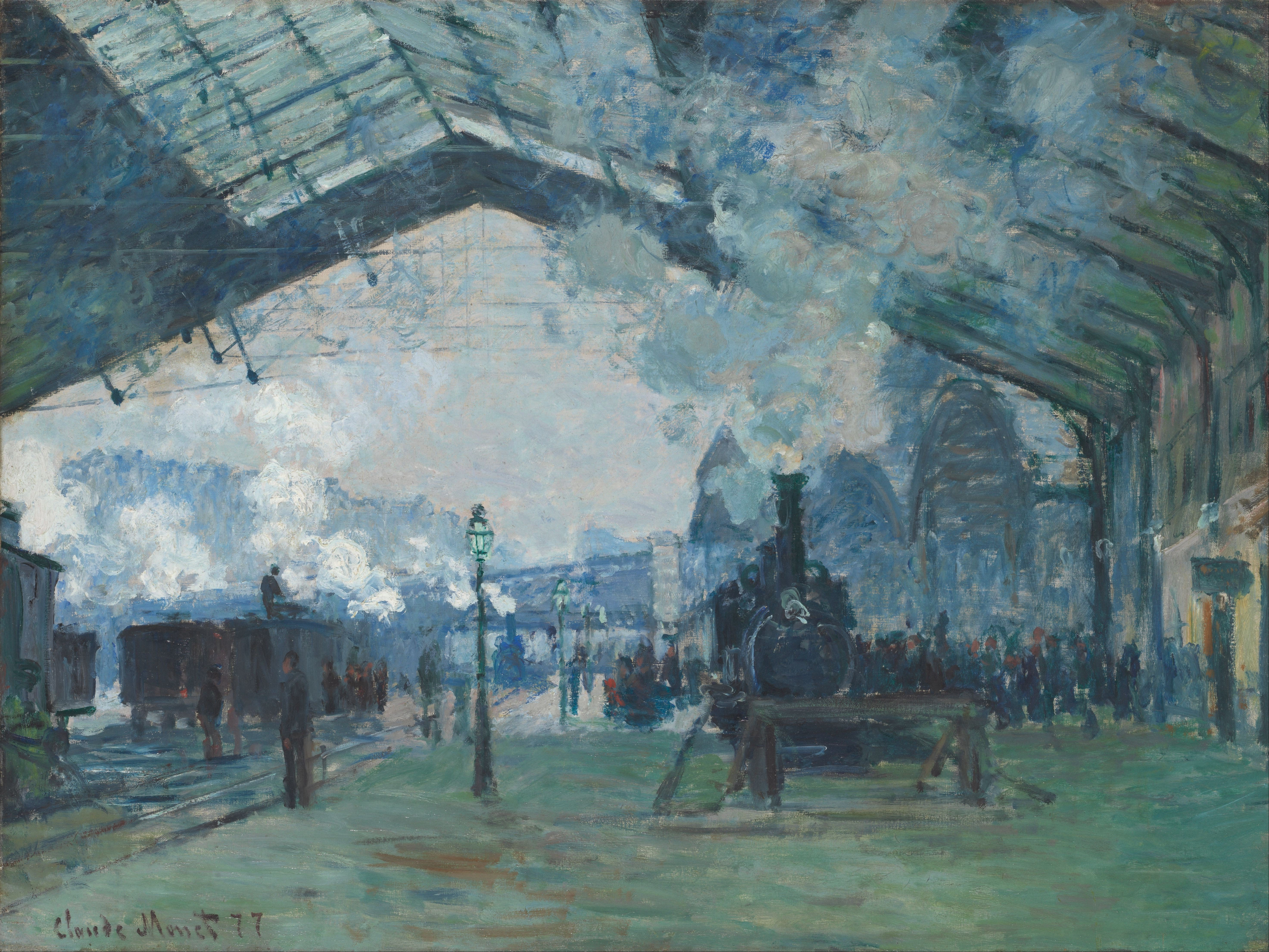
Claude Monet, La Gare Saint-Lazare, le train de Normandie, 1877, Paris

“[Monet] was doggedly painting the departing locomotives. He wanted to show how they looked as they moved through the hot air that shimmered around them. Though the station workers were in his way, he sat there patiently, like a hunter, brush at the ready, waiting for the minute when he could put paint to canvas."

Similar to most contemporary artists, Monet did not paint entirely in the station: all of the paintings were finished in his studio. Due to the handful of preliminary sketches Monet did for this series, we can surmise that he did not have an abundant window of time at the station. Monet sketched first and then transferred some of the drawing features onto the under layers of the paintings. Conservator Kirk Vuillemot studied the version from Art Institute of Chicago and found that the painting consisted of two layers and was built up from a broadly applied lay-in. Monet developed the main compositional elements wet-on-wet after the under layers had dried. He created a varied surface texture by juxtaposing multifarious brushstrokes. Vuillemot described the resulting effect as “smooth, fluid paint and low impasto, and lightly dragged and dry-brush strokes that skip across the surface of the painting.”

Monet started this series in early January 1877 and exhibited seven of the pictures at the Third Impressionist Exhibition in same year on April 5. He finished twelve paintings in roughly four months.

== Description ==
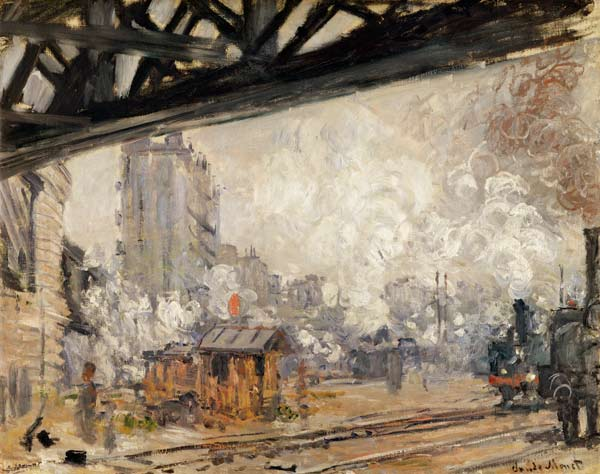
Claude Monet, La Gare Saint-Lazare, 1877, Paris

Each of the twelve paintings did not maintain a consistent point of view. Monet shifted position in almost every painting: some were set inside the massive glass shed, some were out, and some were painted underneath the pont de l’Europe, which created a compressed angle to show the rush of two approaching trains.

Some of his paintings depicted the speeding and unstoppable trains rushing towards the end of the track, while others showed the massive locomotive waiting patiently before setting off. Despite the different compositions, all of the works show the station filled with thick clouds of steam and the pungent plumes of smoke from the burning coal. The smoke obscured objects in the distance, dissolving forms through suffused light. Monet mixed different degrees of sharp and blurry brush strokes and the steam left by passing trains to create this sense of fleetingness.

Despite the harsh conditions, Monet still successfully depicted temporal factors like trains and passengers speeding by. Train signals announce departures and arrivals; switchmen are scattered around, timing everyone's actions; and the smoke and steam imply the movement of heavy machine.

Critics in 1877 claimed Monet captured the arrival and departure of trains and their stages of movement precisely. As Baron Grimm said: “The artist wanted to demonstrate step by step the impression of a train during departure, the impression of a train about to depart, and he has tried, ultimately, to give us the disagreeable impression that results when several locomotives whistle at the same time.”

== Interpretation ==
Scholars have generally seen the Gare Saint-Lazare series as Monet's attempt to depict the industrial age from his perspective. Trains, steam, and smoke convey the concepts of mobility and speed. The vaporized forms are consistent with Impressionism's credo that matter should appear to be in a constant state of motion. Coinciding with Impressionists’ preoccupation with instantaneous and atmospheric change is the ever changing shape and rapid dissipation of steam, a substance that embodies these characteristics in a way that nothing else can. As the critic Jules Janin once wrote: “The poetry of the nineteenth century […] is steam.”

Scholars have also proposed that Monet portrayed how time itself was being modernized and industrialized. Industrialization required to the unification and coordination of time, and this unification could be clearly seen at the synchronized train-schedules and precisely timed operations done by signallers. Monet highlighted the “instant” in painting, showing the standardization of time was the core around which industrialized society revolves.

== List ==
Illus.	Title	#	Dimensions (cm) (in)	Museum	City	Country
	La Gare Saint-Lazare	W438	75 cm × 105 cm 30 in × 41 in	Musée d'Orsay	Paris	France
	La Gare Saint-Lazare, arrivée d'un train	W439	81.9 cm × 101 cm 32.2 in × 39.8 in	Fogg Art Museum	Cambridge	United States
	La Gare Saint-Lazare, le train de Normandie	W440	59.6 cm × 80.2 cm 23.5 in × 31.6 in	Art Institute of Chicago	Chicago	United States
	La Gare Saint-Lazare	W441	53 cm × 72 cm 21 in × 28 in	National Gallery	London	UK
	Le Pont de l'Europe, gare Saint-Lazare	W442	64 cm × 81 cm 25 in × 32 in	Musée Marmottan Monet	Paris	France
	Extérieur de la gare Saint-Lazare, effet de soleil	W443	60 cm × 81 cm 24 in × 32 in	Private collection		
	Extérieur de la gare Saint-Lazare, arrivée d'un train	W444	60 cm × 72 cm 24 in × 28 in	Private collection		
	Les Voies à la sortie de la gare Saint-Lazare	W445	60 cm × 80 cm 24 in × 31 in	Pola Museum of Art	Hakone	Japan
	La Gare Saint-Lazare, vue extérieure	W446	60 cm × 80 cm 24 in × 31 in	Private collection		
	La Gare Saint-Lazare, vue extérieure	W447	64 cm × 81 cm 25 in × 32 in	Private collection		
	La Gare Saint-Lazare, les signaux	W448	65 cm × 81 cm 26 in × 32 in	Lower Saxony State Museum	Hannover	Germany
	La Tranchée des Batignolles	W449	38 cm × 46 cm 15 in × 18 in	Würth Collection	Rome	Italy

== See also ==
- List of paintings by Claude Monet
