= Rain, Steam and Speed – The Great Western Railway =

Painting by J. M. W. Turner

Rain, Steam, and Speed – The Great Western Railway
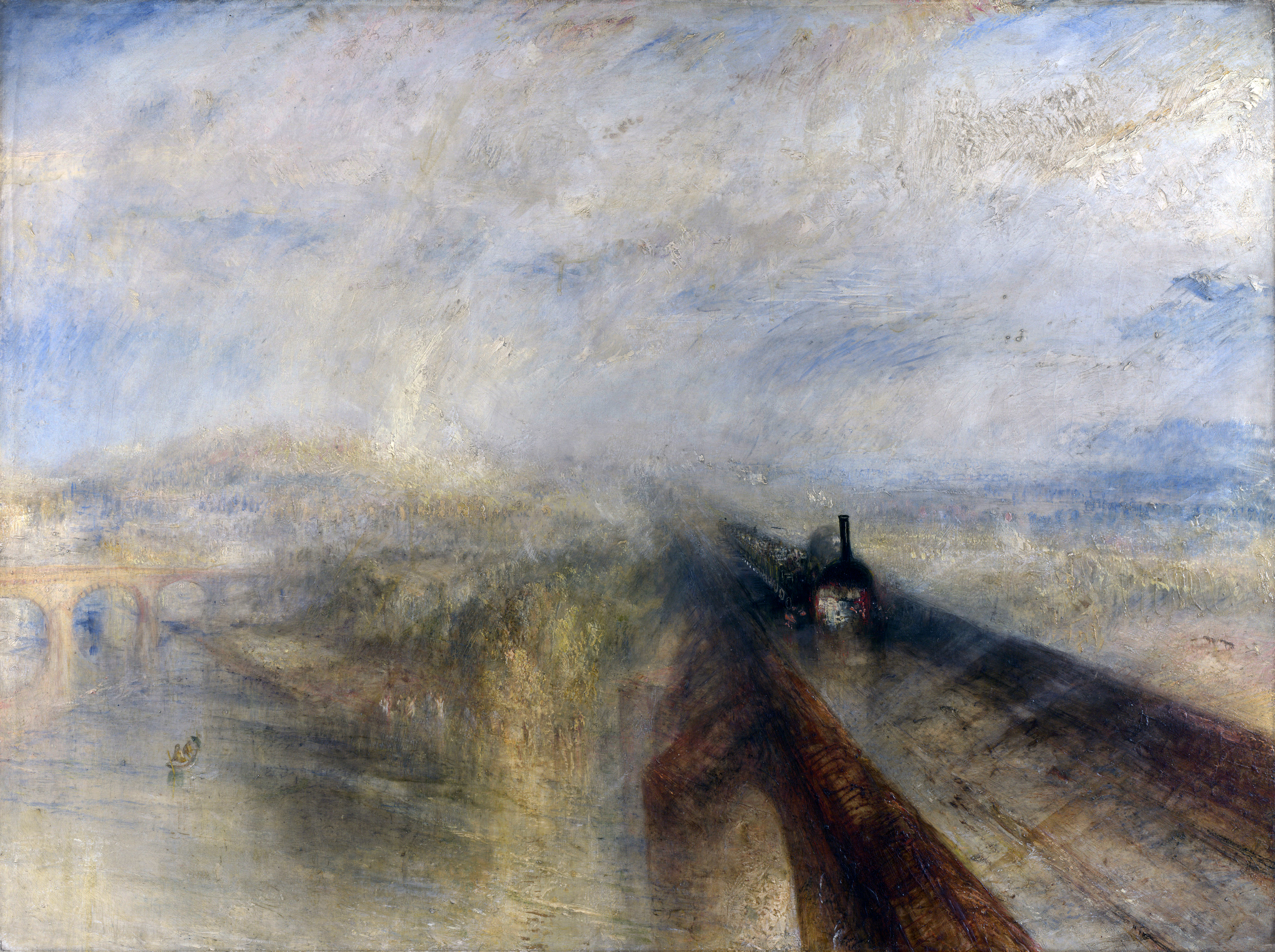
- Artist: J. M. W. Turner
- Year: 1844
- Medium: oil on canvas
- Dimensions: 91 cm × 121.8 cm (36 in × 48.0 in)
- Location: National Gallery, London
- Accession: NG538
- Website: nationalgallery.org.uk/...railway

Rain, Steam, and Speed – The Great Western Railway is an oil painting by the British Romantic painter J. M. W. Turner (1775–1851). It depicts a steam locomotive crossing the Maidenhead Railway Bridge at a rapid speed, surrounded by a vast landscape. Turner was the first painter to use a locomotive as a subject in an academic painting, as well as the first to extend the aesthetic of the sublime into the realm of the industrial age.

Turner's objective was to capture the sense of awe at seeing a rapidly approaching contemporary train. He placed the train tracks along a steep diagonal to increase the viewer's sense of an impending collision. The work includes small figures engaged in rural activities and a hare running away from the train. This reflected widespread public concern over the disruption that the railways caused to rural life.

Rain, Steam, and Speed and other Turner's paintings similar in style influenced early impressionists and 19th century American landscape painters. Mid-20th century American Abstract painters including Mark Rothko, have also been inspired by Turner. It is currently exhibited at the National Gallery in London.

== Background ==
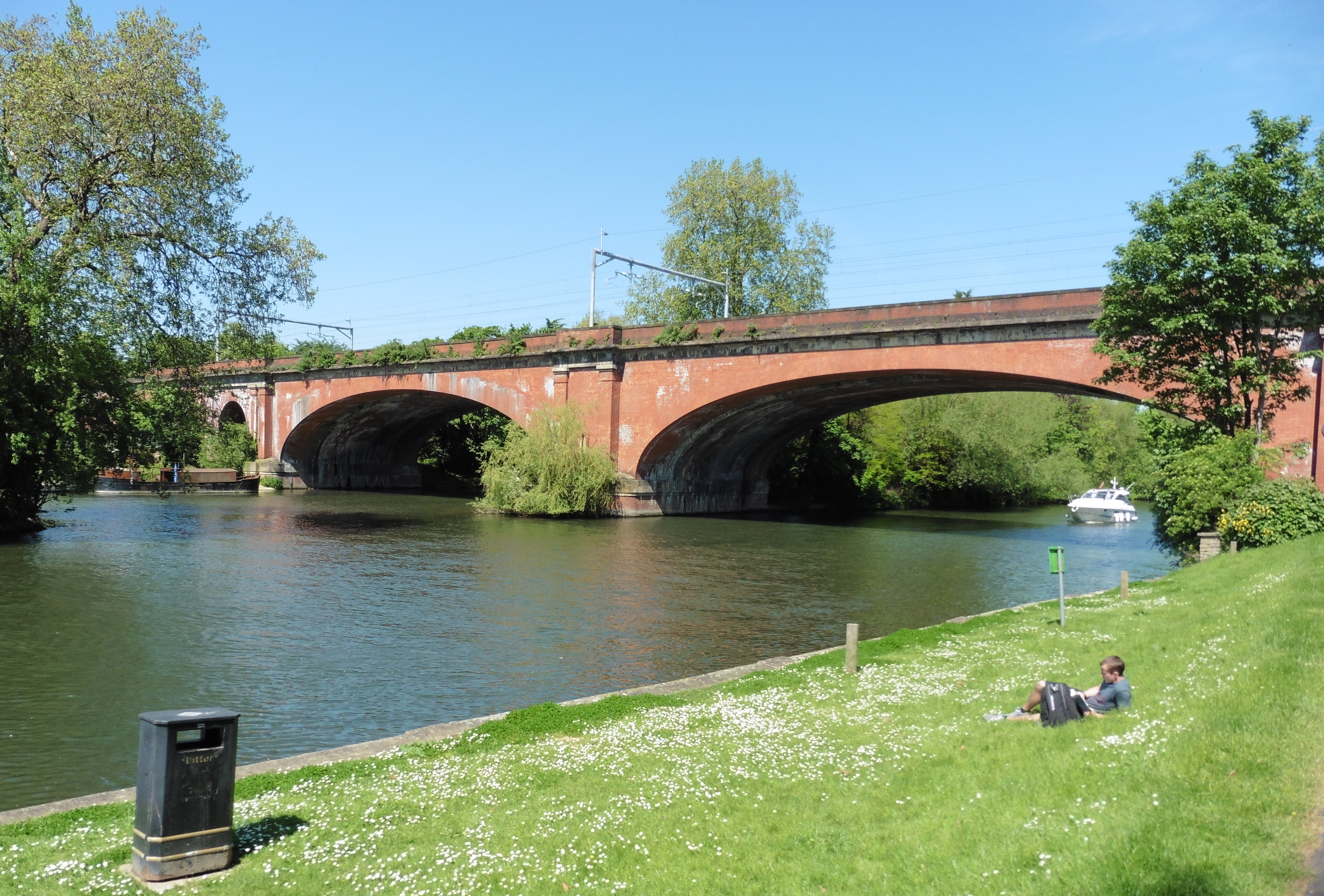
Maidenhead Railway Bridge over the River Thames (1838–1839)

By the early 1840s, the expansion of the railways was changing how people travelled across Britain. To convey the impact of the rapid pace of technological progress, Turner depicted infrastructure and machinery that had only recently come into use. The Maidenhead Railway Bridge had opened for traffic in 1839, as part of a newly completed stretch of the Great Western Railway connecting London to Bristol and Exeter. The line is known today as the Great Western Main Line or GWML.

The locomotive depicted belonged to the Firefly Class, introduced to service in 1840. This class of locomotives had an average speed of 50 miles per hour (80 km/h), which was unprecedented at the time. Gage notes that the depicted train carries open wagons with standing passengers which were used by third-class passengers or goods trains, rather than by an express passenger service.

Location of Maidenhead Railway Bridge across the River Thames

The Maidenhead Railway Bridge spans the River Thames, connecting Maidenhead in Berkshire and Taplow in Buckinghamshire. Designed by the engineer Isambard Kingdom Brunel, it was regarded as a civil engineering marvel, as it had the widest and flattest brick arches ever attempted, so as to keep sufficient clearance for river traffic. The bridge is still in use; it is part of an important artery of the Great Western Main Line (GWML), which links London to the Thames Valley, South West England, and South Wales.

Turner presented Rain, Steam, and Speed at the Royal Academy Exhibition of 1844, alongside six other works. (Note: Bailey qualifies this as "a heroic total", given that Turner was 69 years old.)

== Composition ==
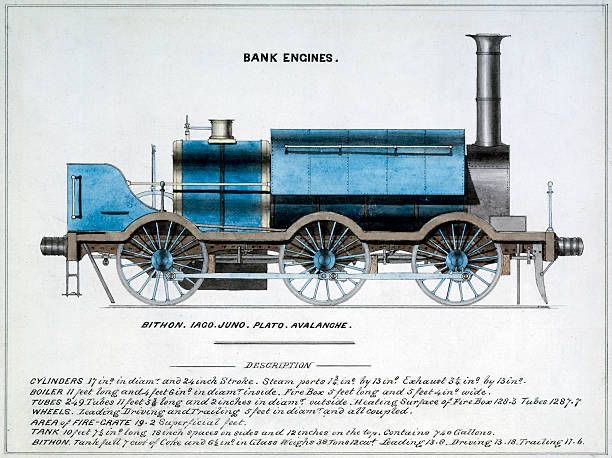
Side elevation drawing of a broad gauge 1830s locomotive (GWR Banking Class). Illustration from Locomotives of the GWR (1857).

During the 1830s and 1840s, locomotives were depicted in detailed mechanical draughts for catalogues and commercial prints, produced to capitalise on what was known as the Railway Mania. Turner was the first to elevate the railway locomotive as a subject worthy of an academic oil painting. He used a kinetic representation that conveys a sense of movement rather than the mechanical imagery prevalent at the time, in order to convey the perception of a train hurtling towards the viewer.

The painting presents a sweeping countryside on a misty and showery day. The Thames flows on the left, flanked by open fields. Patches of blue, ochre, and brown merge across the sky, dissolving the landscape into an atmospheric haze. On the left side, in the far distance, the stone arches of the 1770s Maidenhead Bridge are visible through the mist. The presence of this older crossing establishes a historical dialogue between the traditional and the new forms of travel.

Details in Rain, Steam and Speed
Locomotive with exposed firebox.

Bridge and boat.

Hare running on train tracks.

Farmer with plough.

Female figures.

Turner foreshortens the locomotive and train along the receding lines of the bridge, which projects from the vanishing point outward to the picture plane. Cutting a steep diagonal line from the centre of the painting to its lower-right foreground, the bridge heightens the viewer's sense of an imminent collision. Fraser's Magazine warned its readers to "view the canvas quickly lest the train dash out of the picture, and be away up Charing Cross through the wall opposite."

Around the locomotive and railway bridge, Turner placed small figures engaged in traditional rural activities, such as ploughing and angling. The Turner scholar James Hamilton interprets these peripheral small scenes as an allegory of the disruption that modern technology would generate in traditional countryside life; this was a pervasive public concern during the expansion of the railway during the mid-19th century.

In the lower right, Turner depicted a hare bounding along the rails, pitted into a dramatic race to escape the hurtling locomotive. Turner had previously used the hound and hare as classical symbols of natural speed and pursuit. (Note: See Battle Abbey; the Spot Where Harold Fell (1819) and Apollo and Daphne (1837).)

Turner scholars have interpreted the motif from several perspectives. Shanes suggests it represents a speed contest between the hare and the train or alternatively, an allusion to the popular contemporary country dance "Speed the Plough", contrasting modern mechanised speed with traditional agricultural labour. Meanwhile, Hamilton views it as a warning, proposing that Turner sought to highlight the threat industrial expansion posed to nature.

== Style and technique ==
Sky with impasto in white tones

In Rain,Steam, and Speed, Turner used the innovative methods that were characteristic of his late works. Turner merged the sky, steam, and water by applying thick impasto using stiff bristle brushes and the blade of a palette knife. This unorthodox technique defied the traditional approach of smooth finishes (Note: Art theorist Henry Fuseli prescribed that "the less the traces appear of the means by which a work has been produced, the more it resembles the operations of nature.") in paintings and attracted criticism at the time, (Note: The contemporary painter E.V. Rippingille observed of a Turner painting with similar finishes: "The picture when sent [to the exhibition] was a mere dab of several colours, and 'without form and void', like chaos before the creation.") but it created a precedent for the Impressionist painters in the following decades.

The locomotive is depicted as a dark, indistinct black mass, defined mainly by its upright chimney. Turner removed the front housing to expose the glowing firebox within the boiler, making visible the fiery power driving the machine. Gage observes that Turner used cool tones of crimson lake to illustrate the shadows, yet even though the fire in the steam engine appears to be red, it is also painted with blue and a pea-green. (Note: This tone of green was obtained by combining a yellow, blue and white pigments.)

Three white clouds of steam linger in the air behind the engine, spaced out so as to visualise the speed at which it has passed. By concentrating crisp, dark, and tactile pigment almost exclusively on the chimney, boiler, and tracks, he established a sharp visual anchor against the surrounding blur, capturing what Hamilton describes as the "retinal afterimage" of a fast-moving train.

For the landscape and sky, Turner began with an absorbent white ground, and over this reflective surface, he laid in thin washes of ochre, umber, and cobalt blue, thus creating a luminous, backlit effect. Over these thin foundations, he applied opaque scumbles of lead white and pale yellow (such as chrome yellow or Naples yellow), and swept the semi-dry paint across the canvas, so that it caught on the textured ridges beneath. This optical scattering blurred the boundaries between the bridge, the river, and the storm, visually fusing them into an all-encompassing atmospheric vapour.

In his later years, Turner frequently completed his paintings after he had sent them to the Royal Academy. During varnishing days – the time when painters applied glazes and finishing touches – Turner added new details, sometimes even making substantial changes to the painting. Technical examination of the painting reveals that the running hare was a late addition brushed over the existing paint of the track.

== Critical reception ==
As with other Turner paintings that challenged classical artistic traditions, Rain, Steam, and Speed divided contemporary critics. The Morning Chronicle called it "the most insane and the most magnificent" of his works, and Fraser's Magazine proclaimed that "the world has never seen anything like this picture." And an art critic for The Times identified its defining perceptual ambiguity: "Whether Turner's pictures are dazzling unrealities, or whether they are realities seized upon at a moment's glance, we leave his detractors and admirers to settle between them."

Some critics objected to the use of a locomotive as a subject of an academic painting. The Art-Union considered it "rather an engineering water-colour subject, than suitable for an oil picture," although conceding that "it is, however, as agreeably painted as the very unmanageable material would admit of." John Ruskin, the staunch defender of Turner’s work, commented that he had painted it "merely to show what he could do with so ugly a subject".

== Provenance and legacy ==
The painting was donated to the nation in 1856 as part of the Turner Bequest and is currently displayed at the National Gallery in London.

Turner’s expressive treatment of light, luminous backlit colour, and dissolution of boundaries in Rain, Steam, and Speed and related works directly inspired the early Impressionists Claude Monet and Camille Pissarro. The work was the first to extend the aesthetic of the sublime (Note: In the mid-18th century, Edmund Burke had defined the aesthetic ideal of "the sublime", which he described as the awe and disorientation we feel when confronting the power of nature. He posited that the sublime could only be achieved through poetry because painting was incapable of depicting movement, being limited to the static representation of objects.) into the realm of the industrial age, laying the groundwork for 19th-century American painters to depict railroads and bridges as symbols of progress.

In 1966, the abstract American painter Mark Rothko recognised a direct aesthetic inspiration from Turner’s open pictorial spaces and floating colour masses. Modern painters Victor Pasmore, Sean Scully, and Olafur Eliasson, who worked with light, scale, and environment, have also been inspired by Turner's kinetic mark-making and immersive atmospheric space.

== See also ==
- List of paintings by J. M. W. Turner
- Trains in art
