= Attic =

Space or room below a pitched roof of a house or other building

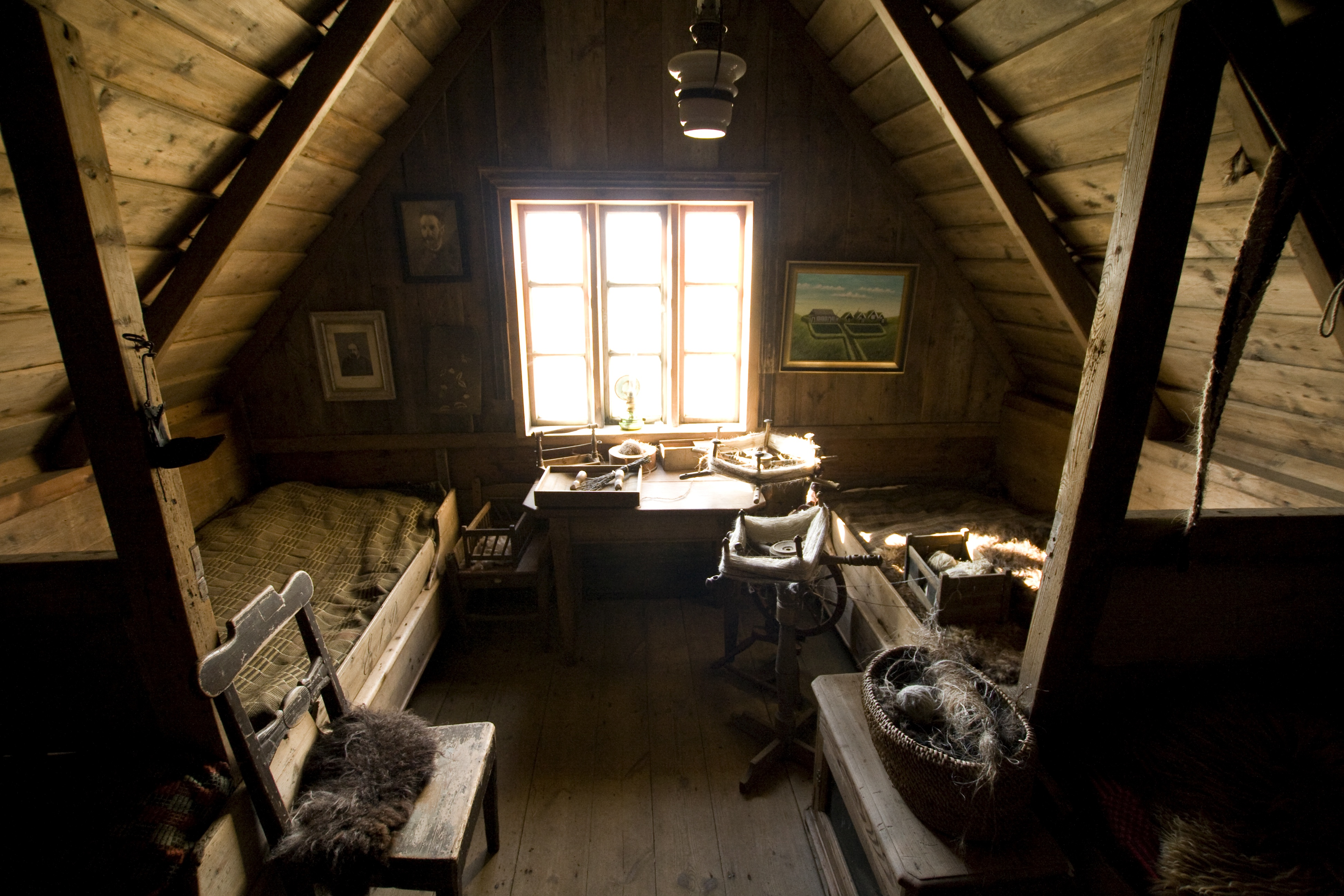
Attic bedroom in Skógar, Iceland

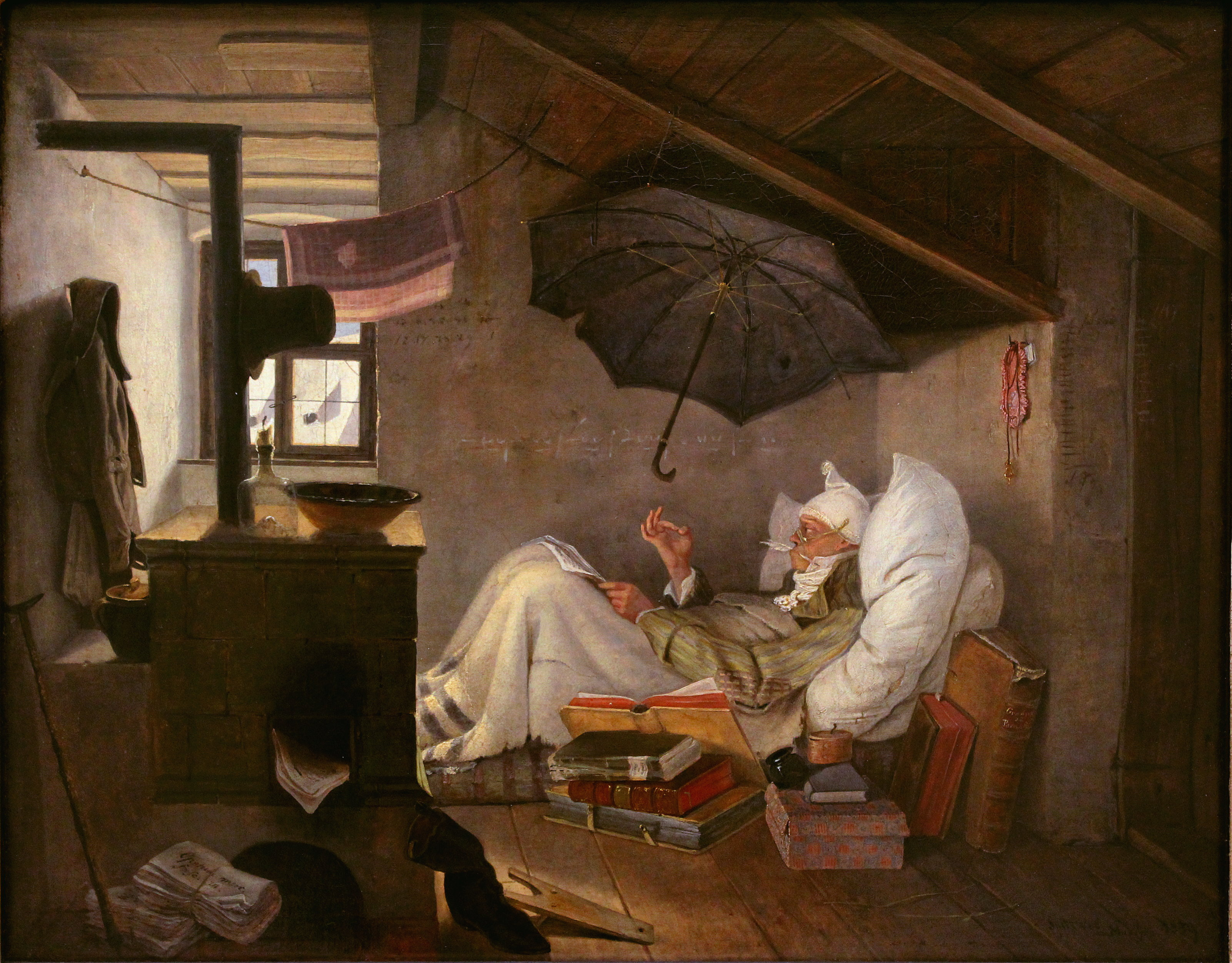
The Poor Poet, by Carl Spitzweg, 1839 (Neue Pinakothek)

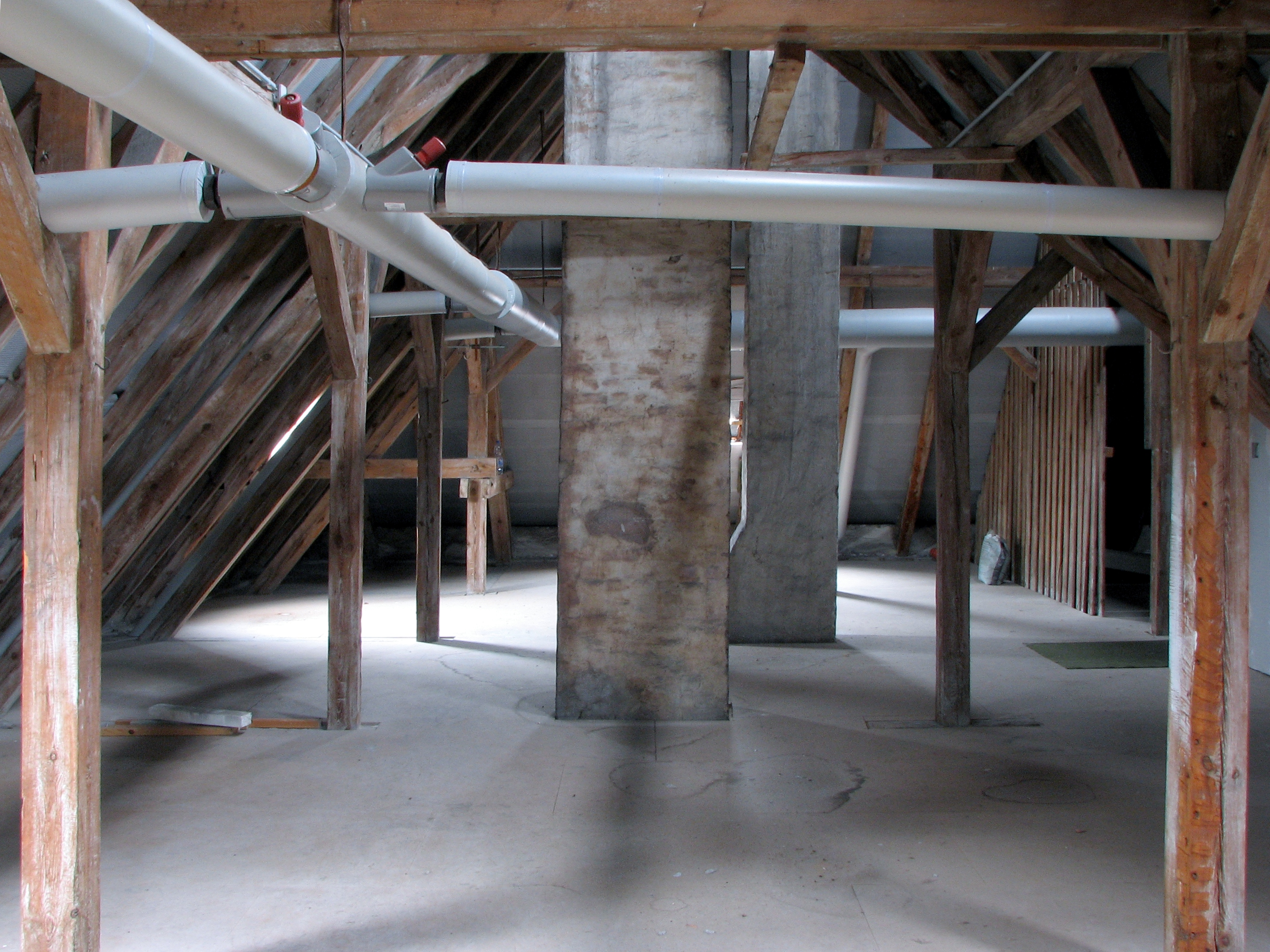
Attic in Berlin, Germany

An attic (sometimes referred to as a loft) is a space found directly below the pitched roof of a house or other building. It is also known as a sky parlor or a garret. Because they fill the space between the ceiling of a building's top floor and its slanted roof, attics are known for being awkwardly-shaped spaces with difficult-to-reach corners and often exposed rafters.

While some attics are converted into bedrooms, home offices, or attic apartments complete with windows and staircases, most remain difficult to access, and are usually entered using a loft hatch and ladder. Attics help control temperatures in a house by providing a large mass of slowly moving air, and are often used for storage. The hot air rising from the lower floors of a building is often retained in attics, further compounding their reputation as inhospitable environments. However, in recent years, they have been insulated to help decrease heating costs, since uninsulated attics account for 15% of the energy loss in average houses.

A loft or mezzanine is also the uppermost space in a building, but is distinguished from an attic in that an attic typically constitutes an entire floor of the building, while a loft or mezzanine covers only a few rooms, leaving one or more sides open to the lower floor.

Attics are found in many different shapes and sizes. They also have many uses: In residential buildings, they are either small unusable spaces filled with insulation, or spaces with storage or HVAC equipment. Some commercial buildings also have attics under pitched roofs that are usually used for storage, mechanical equipment, or for roof access.

== Etymology ==
The word "attic" is derived from the Attica region of Greece and comes from Attic style architecture. The term referred to "a low decorative façade above the main story of a building" and, as used in the phrase "attic order", had originally indicated a small decorative column above a building's main façade.

== Ventilation ==
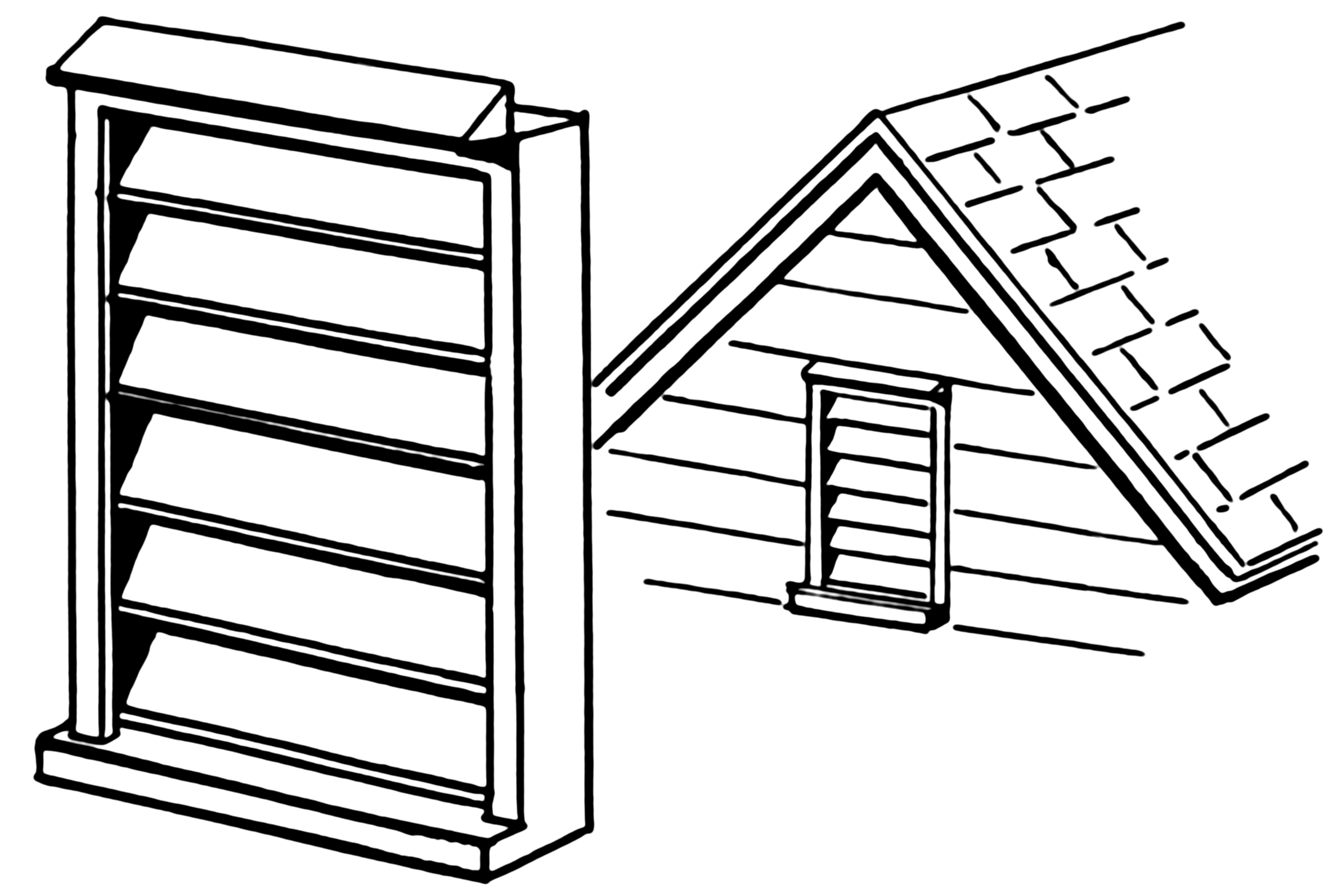
Louvered attic vent in a gable

Modern building codes permit both vented and unvented attics in all climates, if a building is otherwise correctly constructed. However, unoccupied attics should usually be ventilated to reduce the accumulation of heat and moisture that contribute to mold growth and decay of wood rafters and ceiling joists. In cold climates, ventilation also helps to prevent ice-dams on the roof and leaks that they cause. In hot climates, ventilation reduces cooling loads.

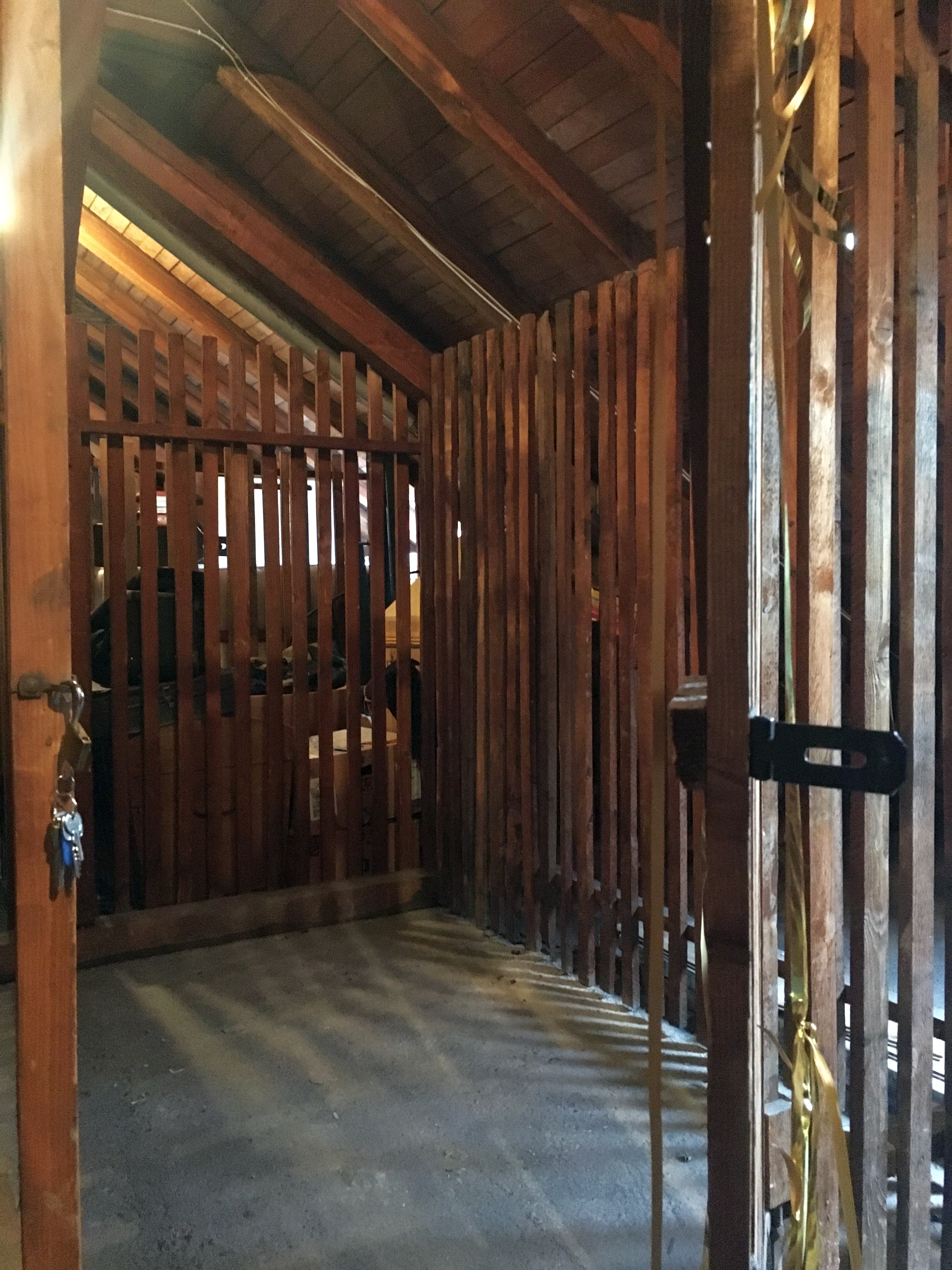
Lockable storage compartments with fence-like wooden walls in the attic of a German apartment house from the 1950s; there is one such space for each of the ten apartments

Video walk through the attic shown left, showing the use of the common areas for drying laundry

Sometimes an insulated roof with an internal vapor barrier is preferable to a ventilated attic. In areas with wildfire hazards, sparks can enter attic vents, so houses are safer without vents. Areas with wind-driven rain, fog or sea-spray might also prefer houses with insulated roofs instead of vents. A habitable attic, or a habitable room without an attic may use an insulated roof so that moist air from the habitable area cannot condense on the roofing materials. Also, a building with a complex roof or many piercings between the conditioned area and the attic might control condensation better or more cheaply with an insulated roof and a vapor barrier.

One common code requirement is that the total area of attic vents be equal to or greater than 1/150 of the floor area of the attic, with 50 percent or more of the vent area located in the upper portion of the attic. Vents and louvers should face away from prevailing winds to keep out driven rain. Soffit vents under the eaves normally provide the low vents. Louvered vents in gables can provide the high vents in small houses or short gables.

If a ridge is open, some metal roofing systems can install ridge vents along the entire ridge line of the roof. Various types of turbine ventilators and exhaust fans can assist with attic ventilation and decrease the required area of passive ventilators.

== See also ==
- Attic ladder
- Basement – Floor of a building which is below grade
- Cockloft – Inaccessible space above a ceiling
- Garret – Small attic used as apartment
- Hayloft – Space above a barn, stable or cow-shed
- Loft – Near-roof part of a building
- Penthouse apartment – Attached unit on the top floor of a building
