= Queraltó S.A Group =

Spanish company selling medicine equipment

R. Queraltó Group is a Spanish company that has been selling medical equipment since 1898.

== History ==
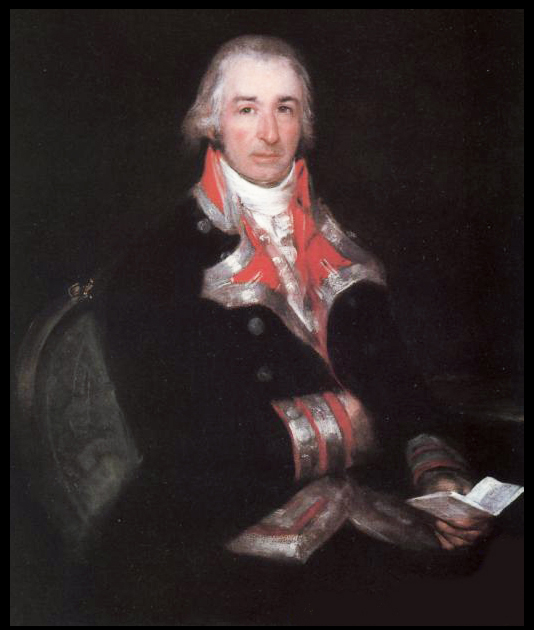
José Queraltó by Francisco de Goya,1802

The company was named after Don José Queraltó, who was a Military surgeon and the personal surgeon of Carlos IV (King of Spain). “Francisco de Goya” portrayed him in 1802. His painting is exhibited in Neue Pinakothek museum of Germany.

Queraltó was the director of Navarra and Guipúzcoa Hospitals. In 1793, he found a way to cure firearms wounds rapidly, covering the wound with lints, bandage, and using sedative when it was necessary.

In 1898, the Queraltó company was set up by Don Domingo Queraltó Horta. Don Domingo was born in Lérida (Spain). He went to Seville as a worker of a Cataluña Company which sold medical equipment.

After settling down in Seville, Queraltó decided to set up his own business. "Bazas la Estrella Roja" was the name of his first store.

In 1903, Domingo Queraltó moved his business to a new and larger store whose doorsign read "Domingo Queraltó. Ortopedia".

After that, Queraltó Company expanded his business to the optics market. His store was one of the first stores that sold optic equipment in all of Andalusia.

In 1922, Queraltó Company opened a new store in Madrid. The company also set up a gauze fabric in Seville.

Domingo Queraltó died in 1930 at age 52, and José Queraltó, his older son, became the director of his company.

José opened another store in Madrid and a laboratory in Seville.

In 1953, Don José Queraltó shared out the company with his brother. Don Arturo Queraltó, who was a pharmacist, got the laboratory but sold it a few years later. The two stores located in Madrid were also sold.

After the flooding of Seville in 1961, the gauze fabric had to close.

In 1970, Queraltó Company got a new director, Jose Queraltó Dastis.

In 1985, Don José Queralto set up Mobiclinic (clinic furniture fabric)

Nowadays, Queraltó works as a distribution company, clinic furniture manufacturing, investment in technology, and counseling. Reyes Queralto is the director of R.Queraltó and Mobiclinic Companies.
