= Attic ladder =

An attic ladder (US) or loft ladder (UK) is a retractable ladder that is installed into an attic door/access panel. They are used as an inexpensive and compact alternative to having a stairway that ascends to the attic of a building. They are useful in areas with space constraints that would hinder the installation of a standard staircase. Attic ladders typically consist of a ladder with wider steps and a steep slope. A drawstring will hang down to allow the ladder to be manually extended. Attic ladders are usually made of wood, metal, aluminum, or fiberglass.

Also, fire departments carry attic ladders on fire apparatus for use to locate and extinguish fires in attic spaces. They are in a single ladder that is often used by firefighters for interior attic access and have hinged rungs, which allow them to be folded inward so that one beam rests on the other, with the rungs hidden away in the middle. This compatibility allows it to be carried in attic scuttle holes, narrow passageways, and small rooms or closets. Folding ladders are usually found in lengths between 8 and 16 feet (2.4 and 4.9 m), while the greatest length is usually 10 feet (3.0 m). These ladders must also have footpads attached to the butt end in order to prevent slipping on hard and soft surfaces.

== Gallery ==
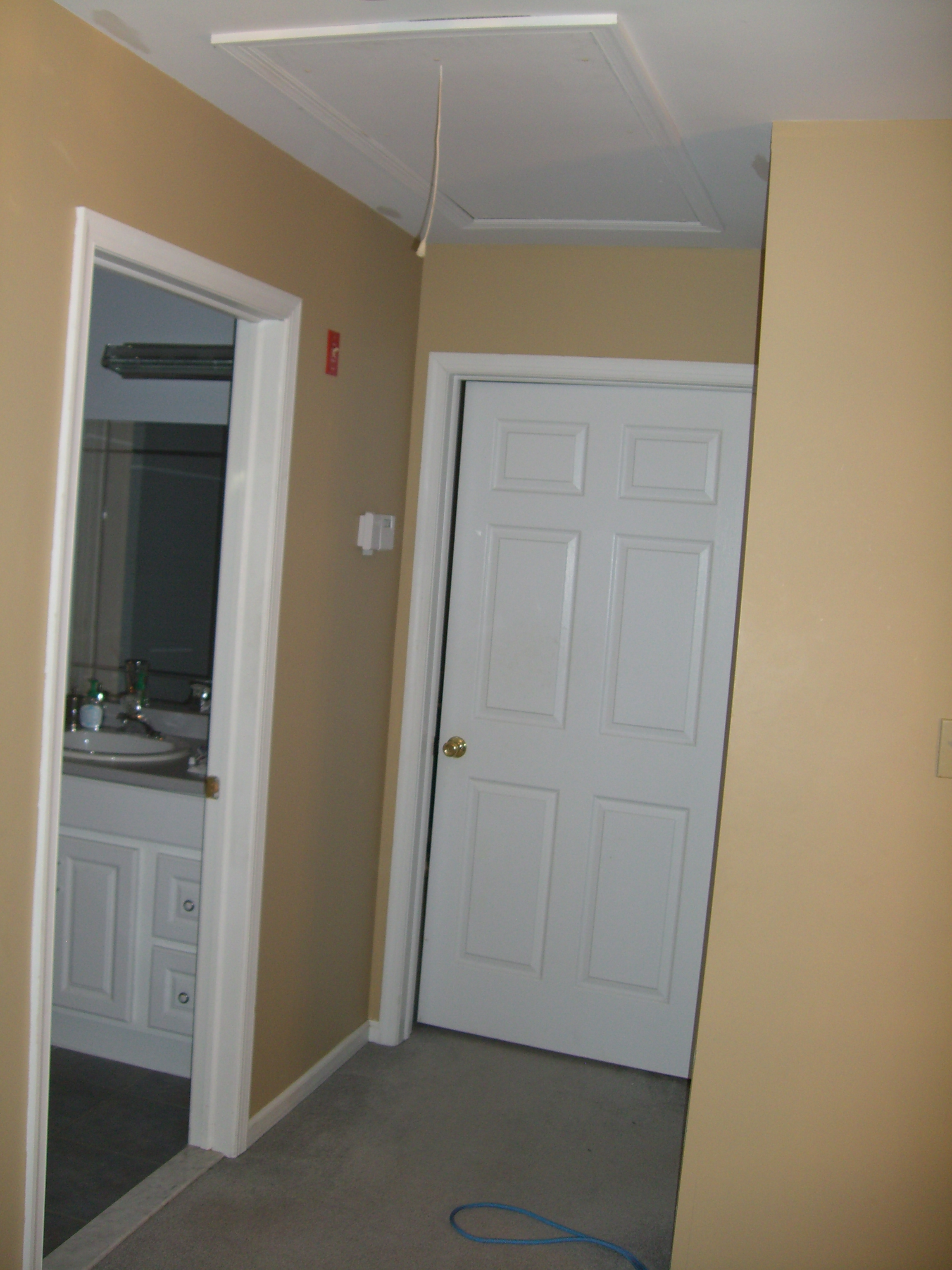
A retractable attic ladder in its closed position.

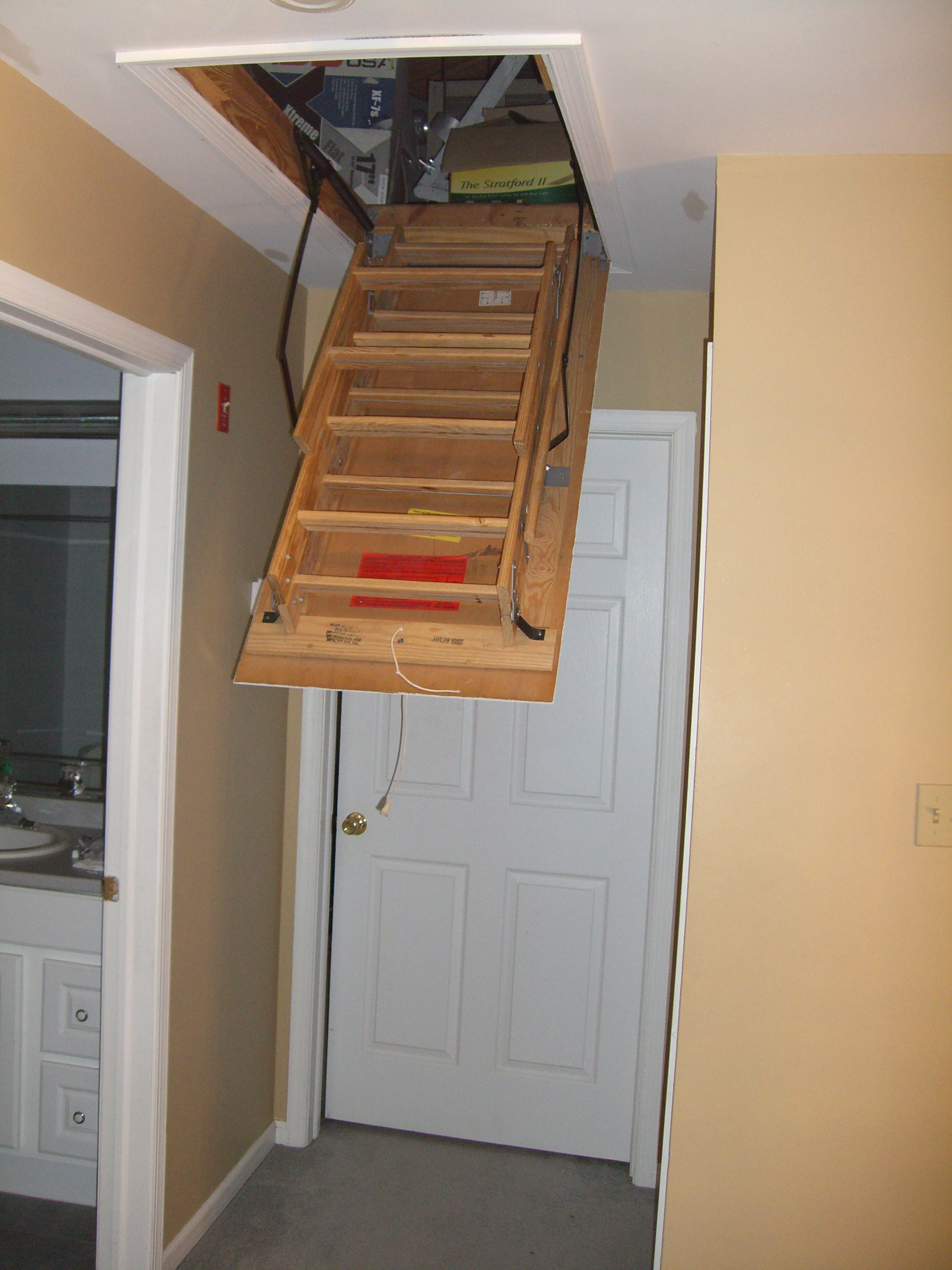
A retractable attic ladder halfway open.

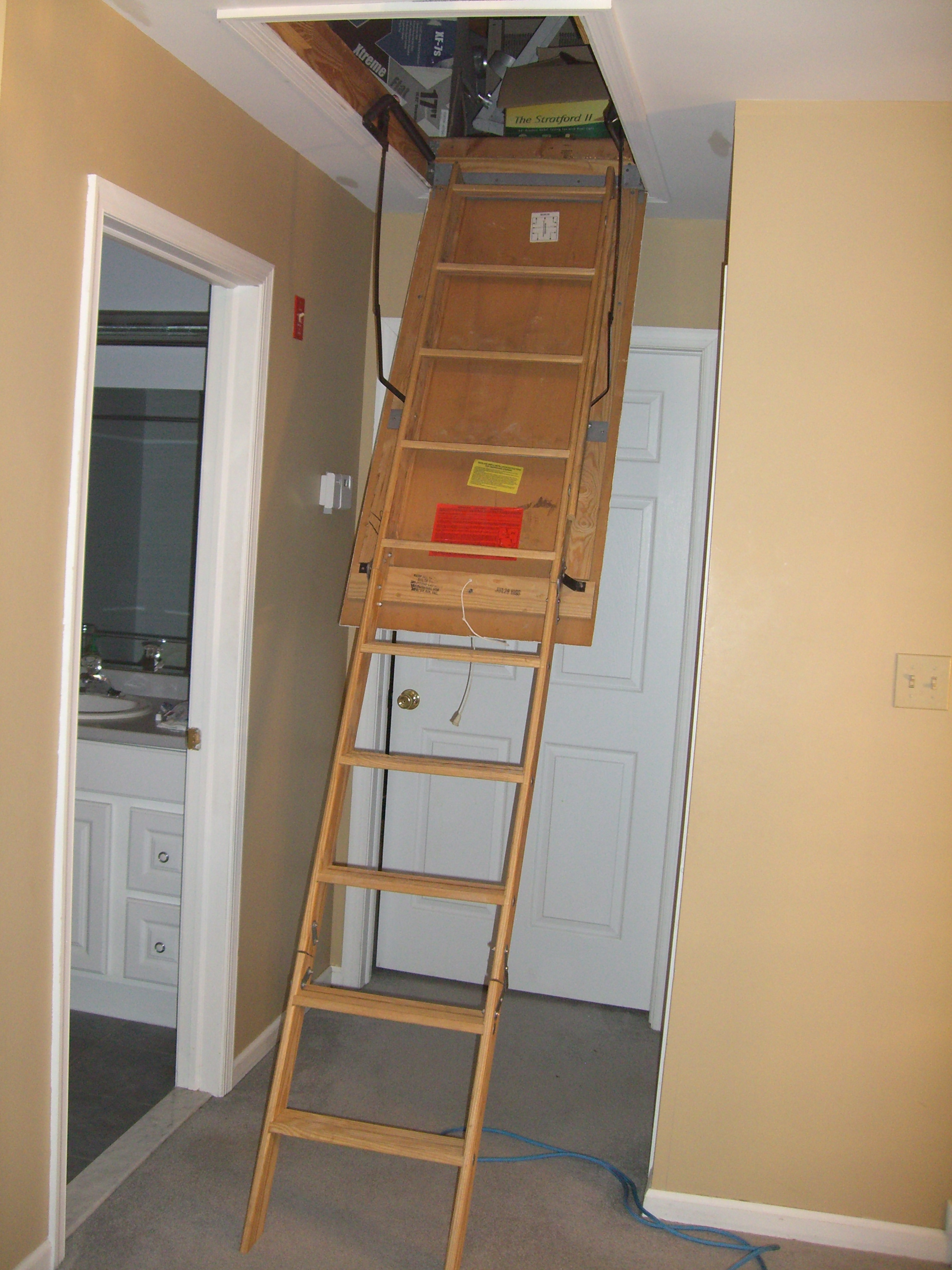
A retractable attic ladder fully extended.

== See also ==
- Escape ladder

== Sources ==
- IFSTA (2008). "Essentials of Fire Fighting and Fire Department Operations 5th Edition"
