= Te tamari no atua =

Painting by Paul Gauguin

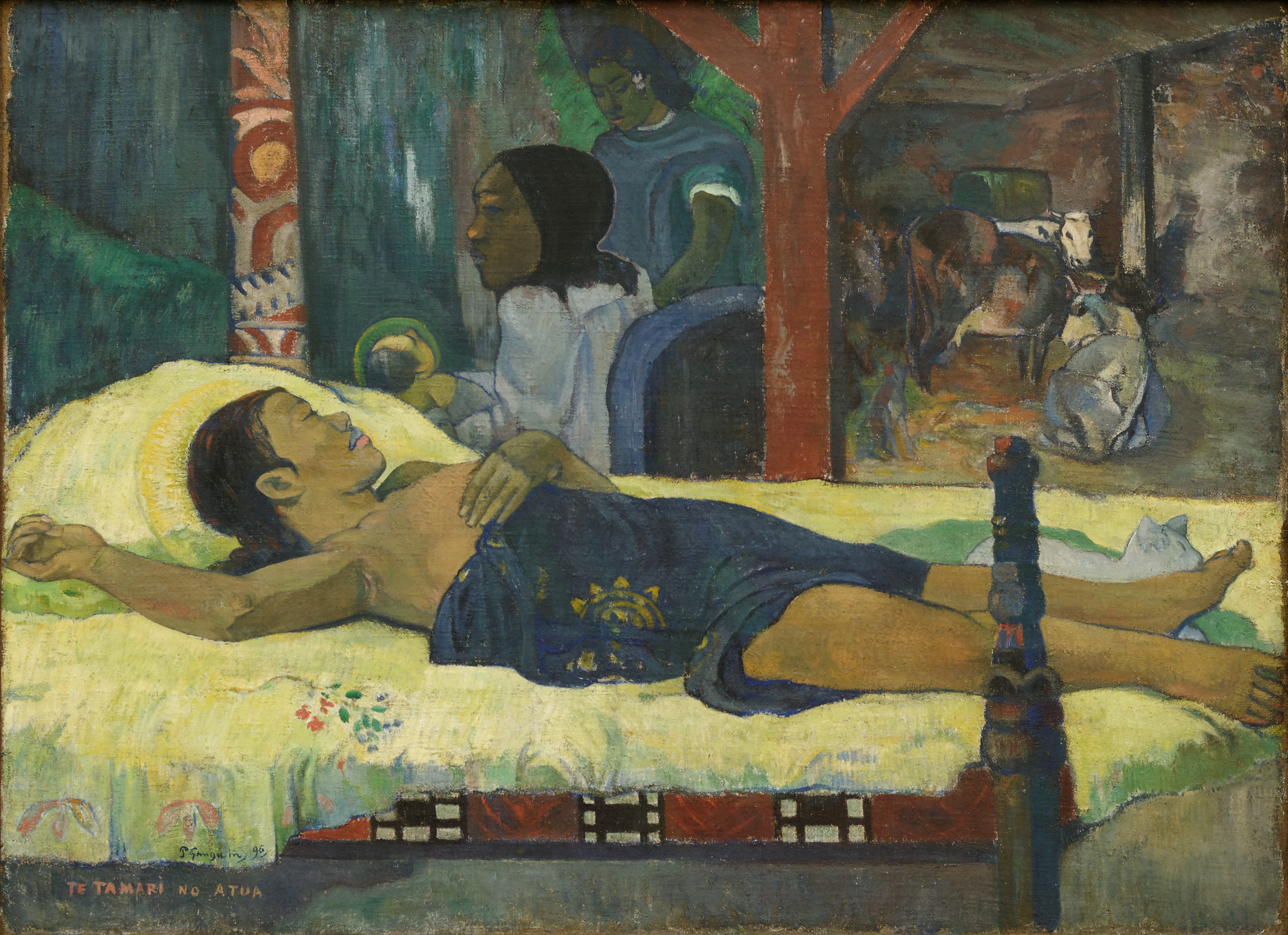
- Artist: Paul Gauguin
- Year: 1896
- Medium: oil on canvas
- Dimensions: 96 cm × 126 cm (38 in × 50 in)
- Location: Neue Pinakothek, Munich

Te tamari no atua (Polynesian for The Son of God) or The Birth is an 1896 oil on canvas painting by Paul Gauguin, now in the Neue Pinakothek in Munich. It forms a Nativity in Polynesian guise.

== Context ==
This painting was one of the first works Gauguin completed during his second stay in Tahiti. It was shipped to Paris in December 1896, a little over a year after he arrived on the island. (Another art historian claims it was shipped in July.) Gauguin's housekeeper-mistress Pahura gave birth around Christmas 1896, so the painting may have been inspired by her pregnancy.

The stable in the background appears to be a quotation (perhaps from a painting by a Dutch artist or a carving on the Church of St Trophime in Arles), which is typical of the "cross-cultural cut-and-paste" practised by Gauguin.

During his career, Gauguin painted many works with Christian themes. The art historian Nancy Mowll Mathews sees his return to religious motifs as marking a shift from an avant-garde to a more conventional audience. The paintings from his first Tahitian trip used imagery so personal that he needed to write the book Noa Noa to explain it, whereas the subject here would be readily recognizable and could resonate with the more conventional colonial society. Intellectual circles in Tahiti at the time were discussing the native religion that had existed before the Christian missionaries and the "universality" of religion.

At the same time, the nudity and pose of the model carries sexual suggestions, creating a "discreet but shocking paradox" in the virgin Mary. The big pillow in the bed and the cat at Mary's feet may be borrowed from Manet's controversial painting Olympia, which Gauguin had as a photograph on his wall.
