= Olindo =

Olindo is a given name. Notable people with the given name include:

- Olindo Guerrini (1845-1916), Italian poet
- Olindo Iacobelli (born 1945), Italian racing driver
- Olindo Koolman (born 1942), Aruban politician
- Olindo Mare (born 1973), American football player
- Olindo Vernocchi (1888-1948), Italian politician and journalist

== See also ==
- Jerusalem Delivered#Plot summary
