= Neue Pinakothek =

Art museum in Munich, Germany

- Neue Pinakothek
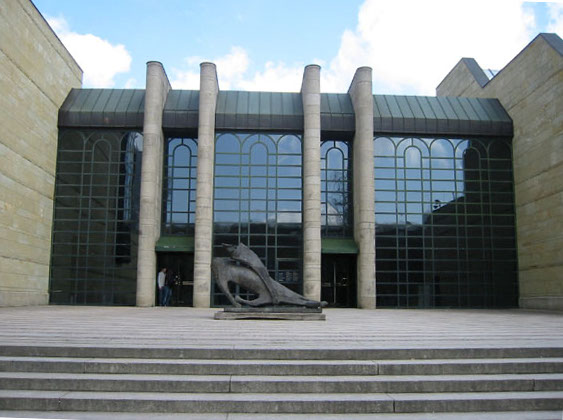
- The Neue Pinakothek opened in 1981
- Established: 1853
- Location: Munich, Germany
- Coordinates: 48°8′59″N 11°34′16″E
- Type: art museum
- Website: www.pinakothek.de/en/

The Neue Pinakothek (German: [ˈnɔʏ.ə pinakoˈteːk], New Pinacotheca) is an art museum in Munich, Germany. Its focus is European Art of the 18th and 19th centuries, and it is one of the most important museums of art of the nineteenth century in the world.

Together with the Alte Pinakothek and the Pinakothek der Moderne, the Neue Pinakothek is part of Munich's museum quarter (Kunstareal).

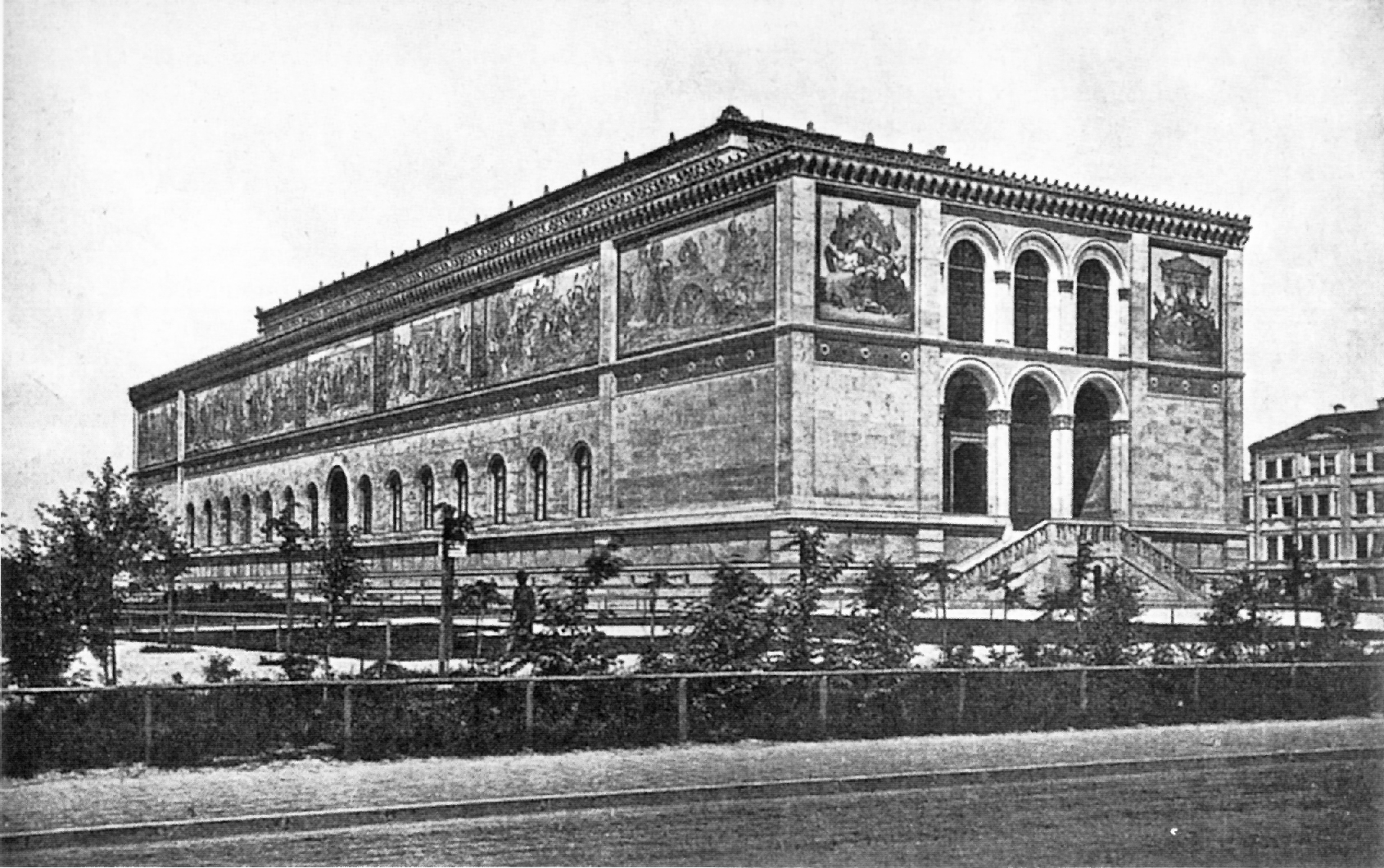
Neue Pinakothek 1880

== The building ==
The Neue Pinakothek was completed in 1859 and was intended to be the first museum in Europe for the exhibition of contemporary paintings. The established schools of European painting were displayed. On the ground floor 186 plaster busts of contemporary celebrities were also displayed.

The building was redeveloped in the late 20th century. Designed by architect Alexander von Branca in the new style of Postmodernism, the building opened in 1981. It combines a concrete construction with a stone facade design.

== History ==
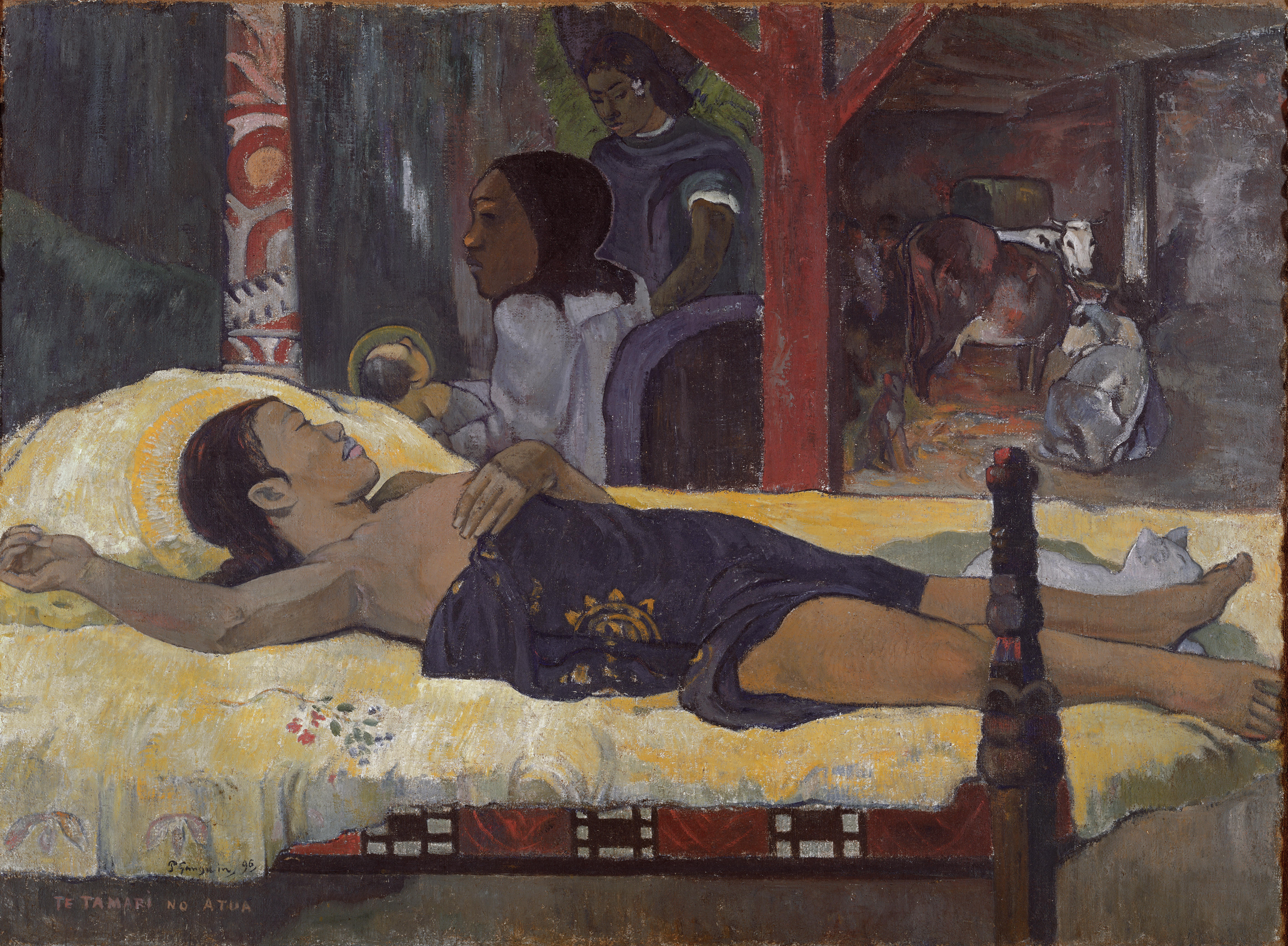
Gauguin's The Birth of Christ (1896), which Hugo von Tschudi brought to Munich and became the foundation of the Pinakothek's modern art collection

Ludwig I of Bavaria began to collect contemporary art already as crown prince in 1809 and his collection was steadily enlarged. When the museum was founded, the separation to the old masters in the Alte Pinakothek was fixed with the period shortly before the turn of the 19th century, which has become a prototype for many galleries.

Owing to the personal preference of Ludwig I, the museum initially had a strong focus on paintings of German Romanticism and the Munich School. Also dynastic considerations played a role, as Greece had become a secundogeniture of Bavaria in 1832. In 1834 Carl Rottmann traveled to Greece to prepare for a commission from Ludwig I for a cycle of great Greek landscapes. These works were installed in the Neue Pinakothek, where the paintings were given their own hall.

The so-called Tschudi Contribution between 1905 and 1914 brought the Pinokathek an extraordinary collection of masterpieces of Impressionism and Post-Impressionism. Hugo von Tschudi was dismissed by Wilhelm II, German Emperor as a penalty for his exhibiting of Gauguin's The Birth of Christ in Berlin's National Gallery. He became the director of the Pinokathek. As general director of the State Collections, Tschudi acquired 44 paintings, nine sculptures, and 22 drawings, mostly from emerging French artists. Since public funds could not be used to purchase these works, Tschudi’s associates raised the money from private contributions after his death in 1911.

The space dedicated to painters of the Modernity was fixed at ca. 1900 by including Henri Matisse and Expressionism. Consequentially a painting of Matisse, which was part of the "Tschudi Contribution", is now displayed in the Pinakothek der Moderne.

In 1915, the Neue Pinakothek became the property of Bavaria. In 1938 the Nazi regime under Adolf Hitler confiscated a self-portrait of Vincent van Gogh, classifying the paintings as degenerate art.

=== Renovations ===
Since January 2019 the Neue Pinakothek has been closed for renovations. Originally, it was planned for the building to remain closed at least until 2025. The opening of the museum to visitors was delayed until 2029 in January 2022.

== Collection ==
The museum is under supervision of the Bavarian State Painting Collections, which houses an expanded collection of more than 3.000 European paintings from classicism to Art Nouveau. About 400 paintings and 50 sculptures of these are exhibited in the New Pinakothek.

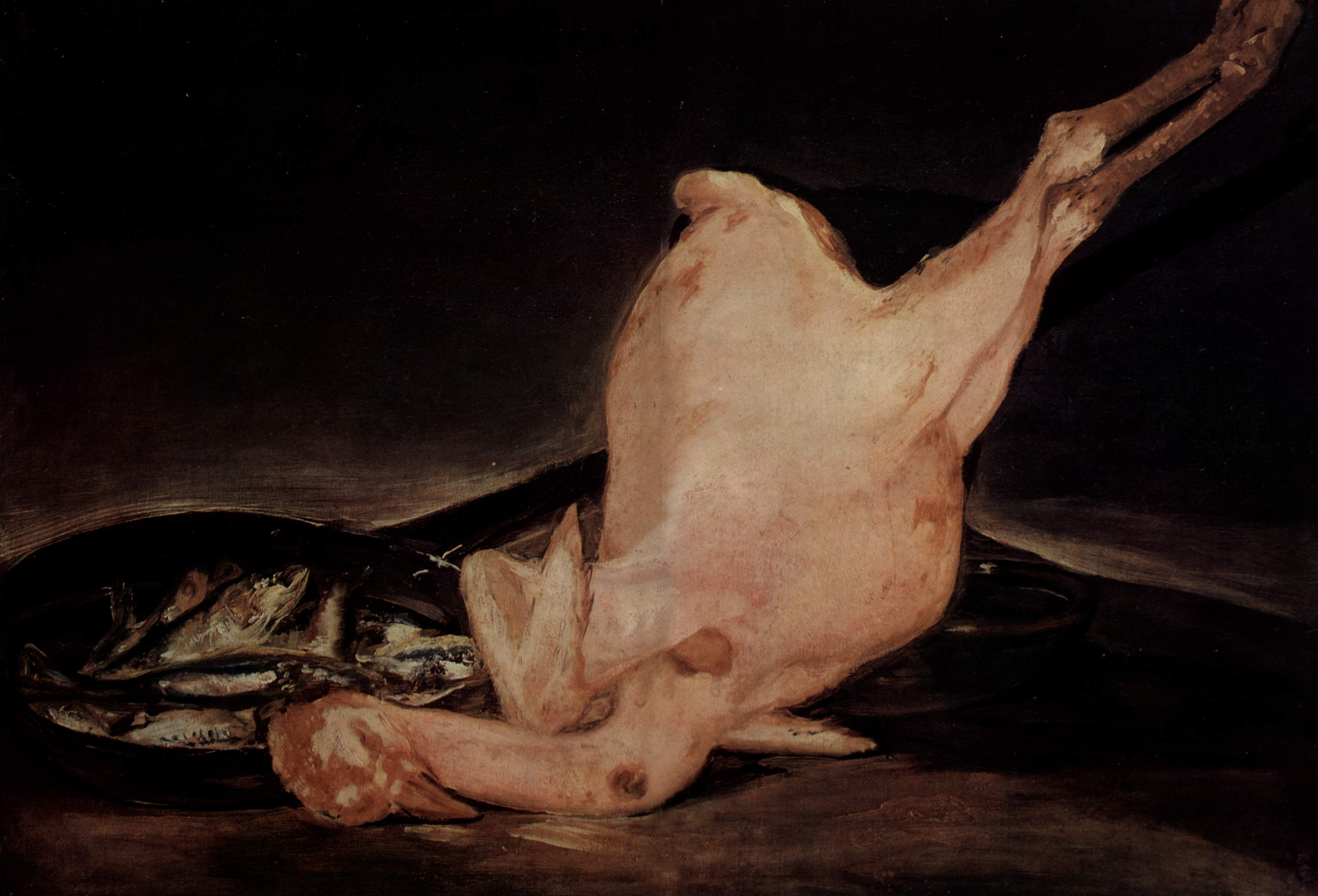
Francisco de Goya, Plucked Turkey (1810)

- International paintings of the second half of the 18th century:

Among others the gallery exhibits works of Francisco de Goya (Plucked Turkey) (Don José Queraltó as a Spanish Army doctor), Jacques-Louis David (Anne-Marie-Louise Thélusson, Comtesse de Sorcy), Johann Friedrich August Tischbein (Nicolas Châtelain in the garden) and Anton Graff (Heinrich XIII, Graf Reuß).

- English and Scottish paintings of 18th and early 19th centuries:

It has masterpieces of Thomas Gainsborough (portraits of Mrs. Thomas Hibbert and of Thomas Hibbert) (Landscape with Shepherd and Flock), William Hogarth (Richard Mounteney), John Constable (View of Dedham Vale from East Bergholt), Joshua Reynolds (Captain Philemon Pownall), David Wilkie (Reading the Will), Thomas Lawrence (The Two Sons of the 1st Earl of Talbot), George Romney (Catherine Clements), Richard Wilson (View of Syon House Across the Thames near Richmond Gardens), Henry Raeburn (Mrs. J. Campbell of Kilberry), George Stubbs (The pointer) and J. M. W. Turner (Ostende). The Pinakothek owns five works by Thomas Gainsborough, more than any other European museum outside the British Isles.

- German artists of Classicism in Rome

like Friedrich Overbeck (Italia and Germania), Friedrich Wilhelm von Schadow (The Holy Family beneath the Portico), Heinrich Maria von Hess (Marchesa Marianna Florenzi), Peter von Hess (The Entry of King Othon of Greece into Nauplia) and Peter von Cornelius (The three Marys at the Tomb).

- German Romanticism

with paintings of Caspar David Friedrich (The Garden Bower), Karl Friedrich Schinkel (Cathedral Towering over a Town), Carl Blechen (Building of the Devil's Bridge) and others.

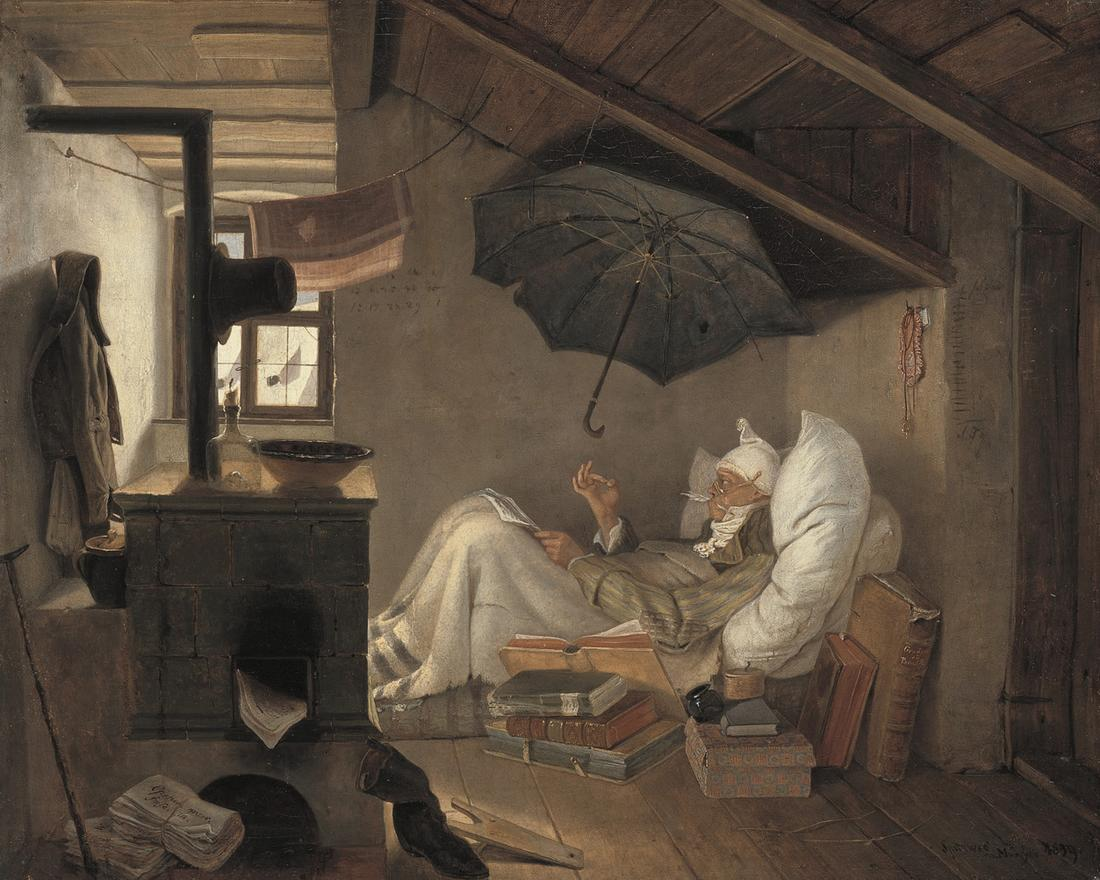
Carl Spitzweg The Poor Poet 1839

- Biedermeier

represented by Franz Xaver Winterhalter (Graf Jenison-Walworth), Carl Spitzweg (The Poor Poet), Moritz von Schwind (A Symphony) and Ferdinand Georg Waldmüller (Young Peasant Woman with Three Children at the Window).

- French Realism and French Romanticism

with Eugène Delacroix (Clorinda Rescues Olindo and Sophronia), Théodore Géricault (Artillery Train Passing a Ravine), Gustave Courbet (Landscape near Maizières), Jean-François Millet (Farmer Inserting a Graft on a Tree), Honoré Daumier (The Drama) and others.

- Deutschrömer (or German-Romans)

such as Hans von Marées (Self-Portrait), Arnold Böcklin (Pan in the Reeds), Anselm Feuerbach (Medea) and Hans Thoma (Landscape in the Taunus).

- History paintings

with Wilhelm von Kaulbach ( King Ludwig I surrounded by artists), Karl Theodor von Piloty (Seni and Wallenstein), Franz von Defregger (Das letzte Aufgebot) and Hans Makart (Die Falknerin).

- German Realism

like Wilhelm Leibl (Portrait of Frau Gedon), Franz von Lenbach (Aresing Village Street) and Adolph Menzel (Living-Room with the Artist's Sister).

- German Impressionists

especially Max Liebermann (Boys Bathing), Lovis Corinth (Eduard, Count von Keyserling), August von Brandis (Durchblick) and Max Slevogt (The Day's Work Done).

Édouard Manet Luncheon in the Studio 1868

- French Impressionists

One of the world's leading collections with masterpieces of Pierre-Auguste Renoir (Portrait of a Young Woman), Édouard Manet (Luncheon in the Studio) (Monet Painting on His Studio Boat), Claude Monet (The Bridge at Argenteuil), Paul Cézanne (The Railway Cutting), Paul Gauguin (The Birth - Te tamari no atua), Edgar Degas (Woman Ironing), Camille Pissarro (Street in Upper Norwood), Alfred Sisley (The Road to Hampton Court), Paul Sérusier (The Laundresses) and Vincent van Gogh (Sunflowers) (The Weaver).

- Symbolism and Art Nouveau and early 20th century

represented among others by Giovanni Segantini (L'aratura), Gustav Klimt (Margaret Stonborough-Wittgenstein), Paul Signac (S.Maria della Salute), Maurice Denis (Gaulish Goddess of Herds and Flocks), Henri de Toulouse-Lautrec (Le jeune Routy à Céleyran), James Ensor (Still Life in the Studio), Édouard Vuillard (Café Scene), Ferdinand Hodler (Tired of Life), Franz von Stuck (The Sin), Edvard Munch (Woman in Red Dress (Street in Aasgaardstrand)), Walter Crane (Neptune's horses), Thomas Austen Brown (Mademoiselle Plume rouge), Pierre Bonnard (Lady at the Mirror) and Egon Schiele (Agony).

- Sculptures

Also sculptures of the 19th century are exhibited, for example works of Bertel Thorvaldsen (Adonis), Antonio Canova (Paris), Rudolph Schadow (Woman Tying Her Sandal), Auguste Rodin (Crouching Woman (La femme accroupie)), Max Klinger (Elsa Asenijeff), Aristide Maillol (La Flore), Pablo Picasso (Le Fou) and others.

== Gallery ==
Other works in the collection of the Neue Pinakothek

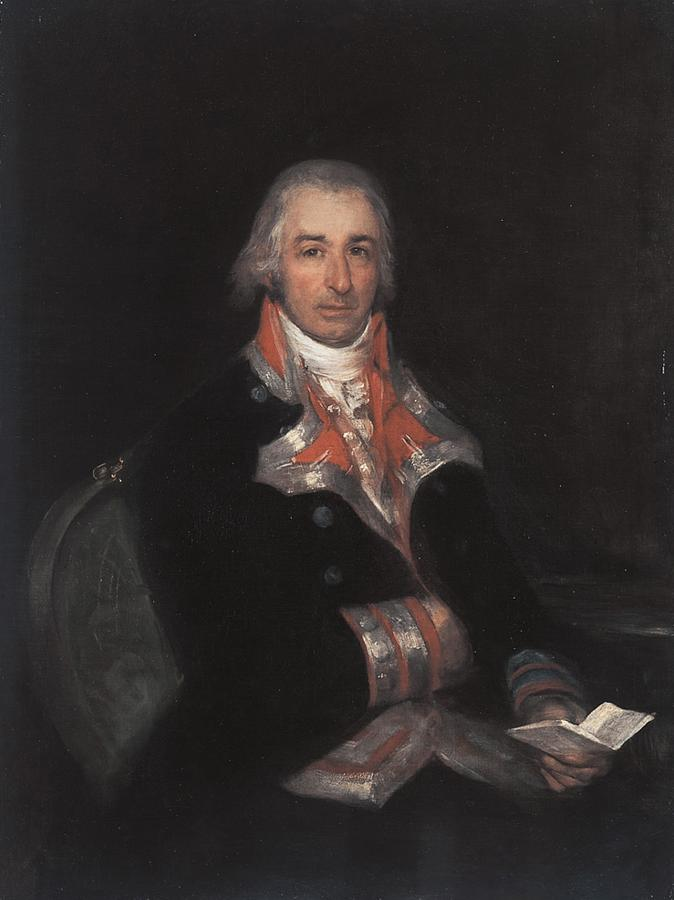
Francisco de Goya —
Don José Queraltó as a Spanish Army doctor

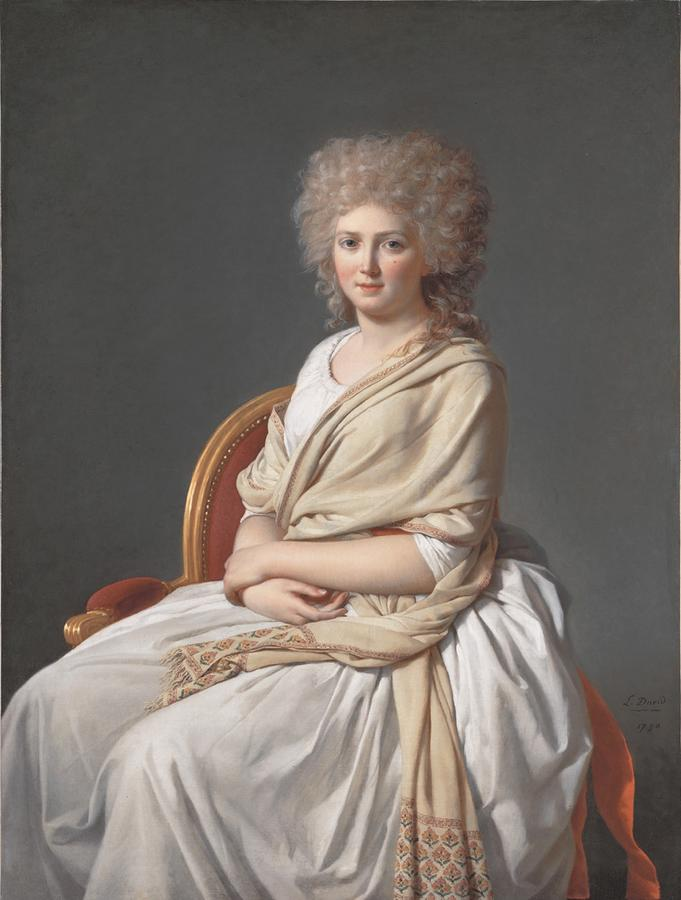
Jacques-Louis David —
Anne-Marie-Louise Thélusson, Comtesse de Sorcy

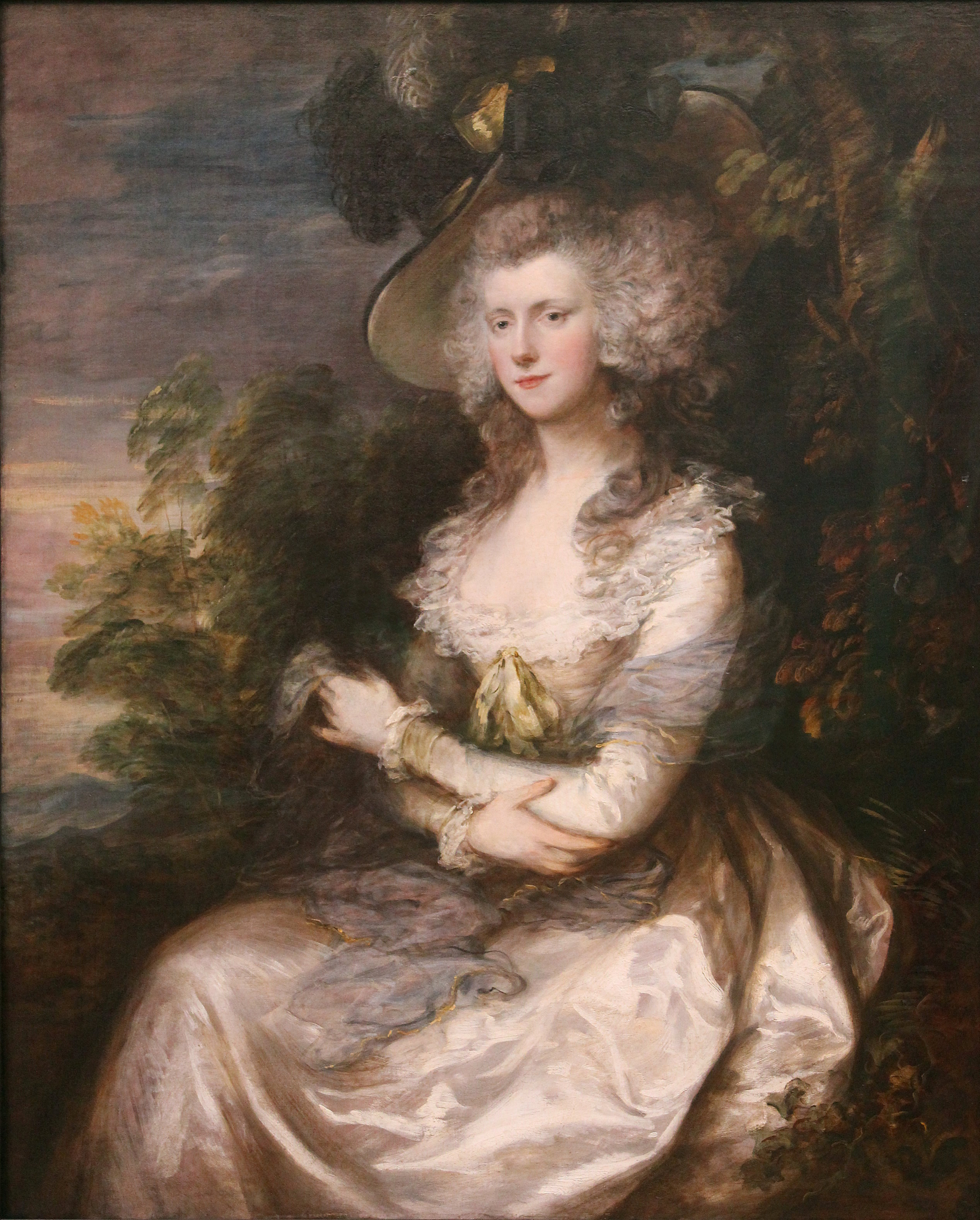
Thomas Gainsborough —
Mrs. Thomas Hibbert

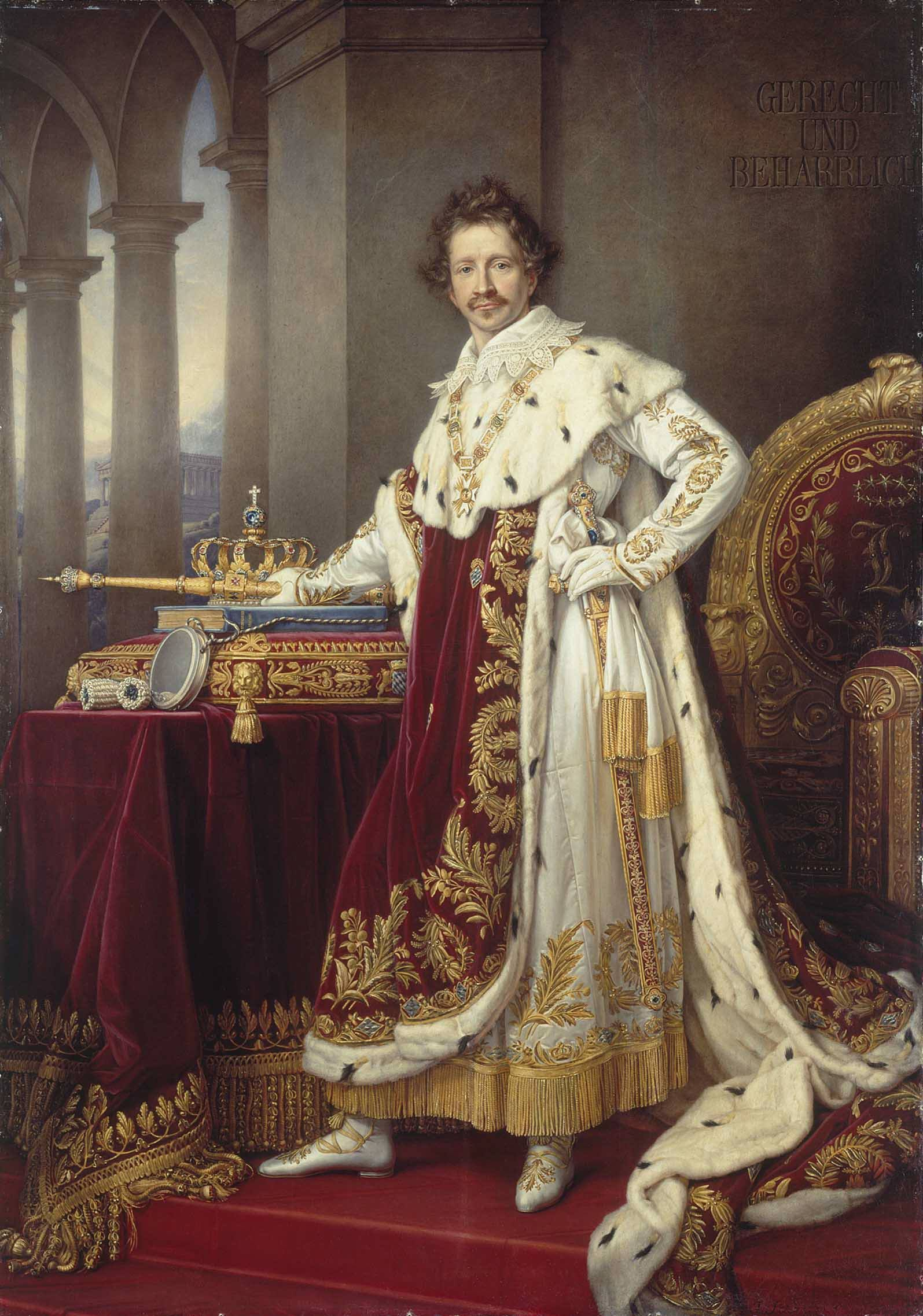
Portrait of Ludwig I of Bavaria by Joseph Karl Stieler, 1826

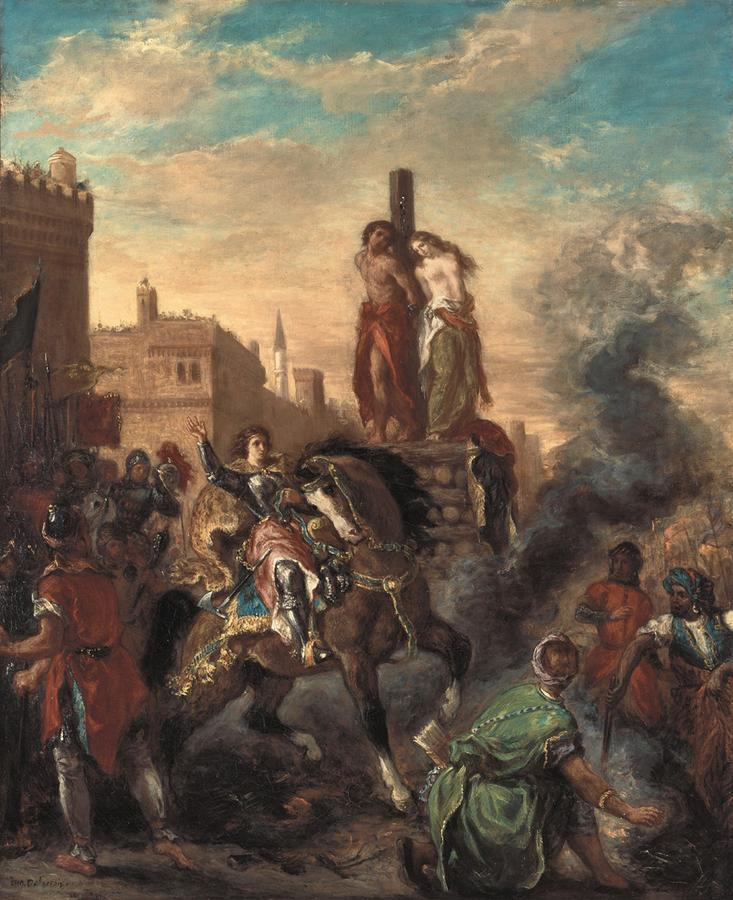
Eugène Delacroix —
Clorinda Rescues Olindo und Sophronia

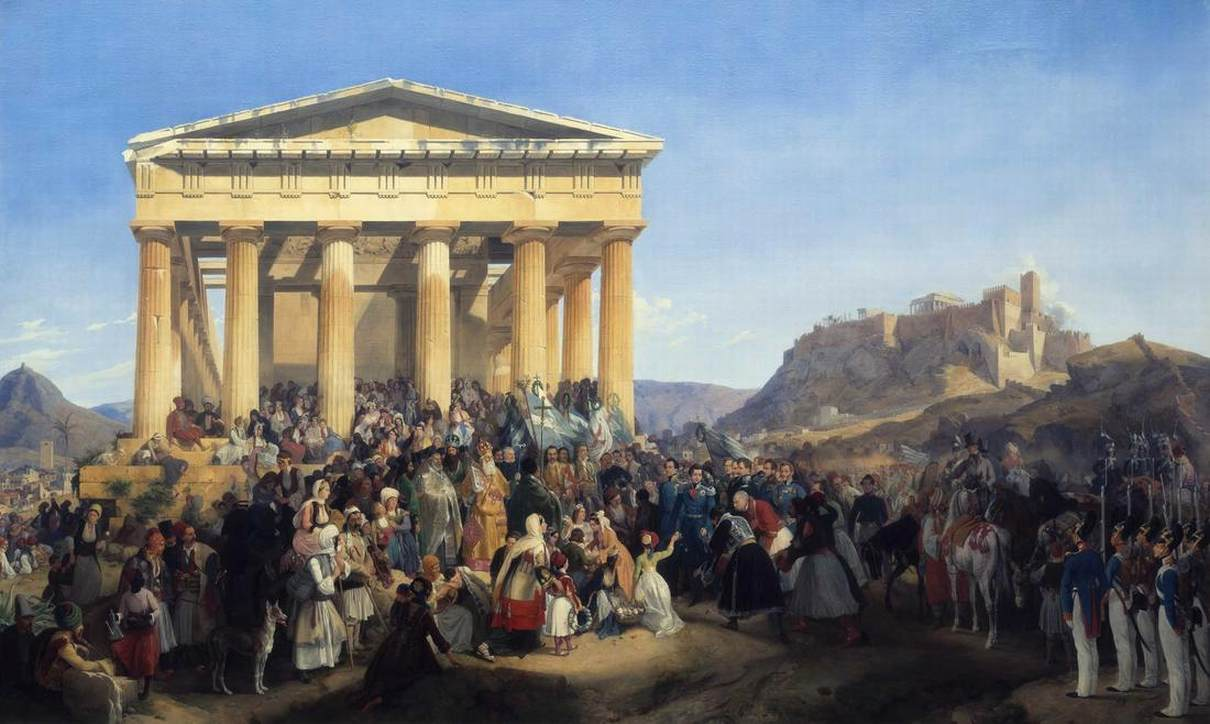
Peter von Hess —
The Entry of King Otto of Greece into Athens

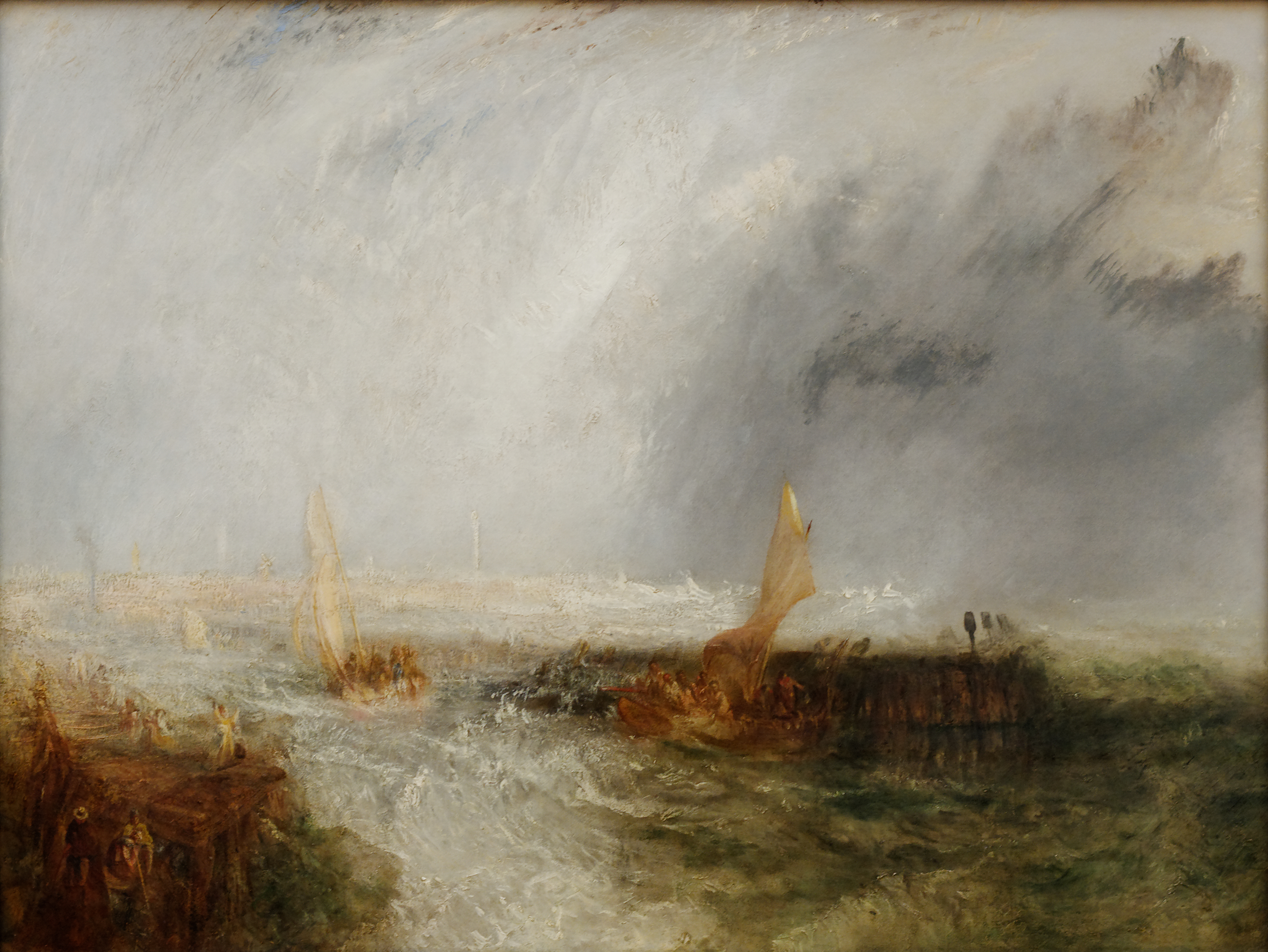
Ostend by J.M.W. Turner, 1844

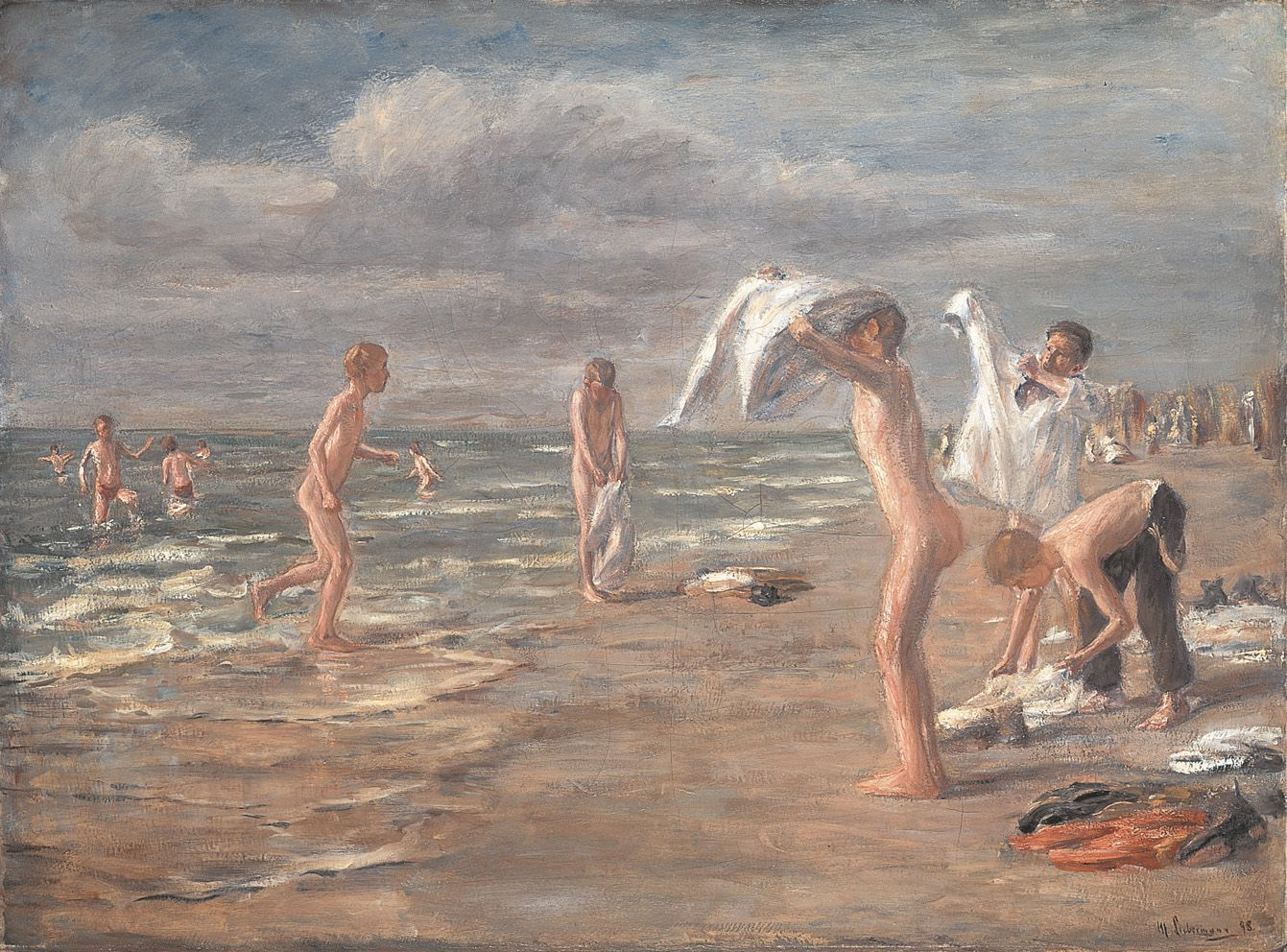
Max Liebermann —
Boys Bathing

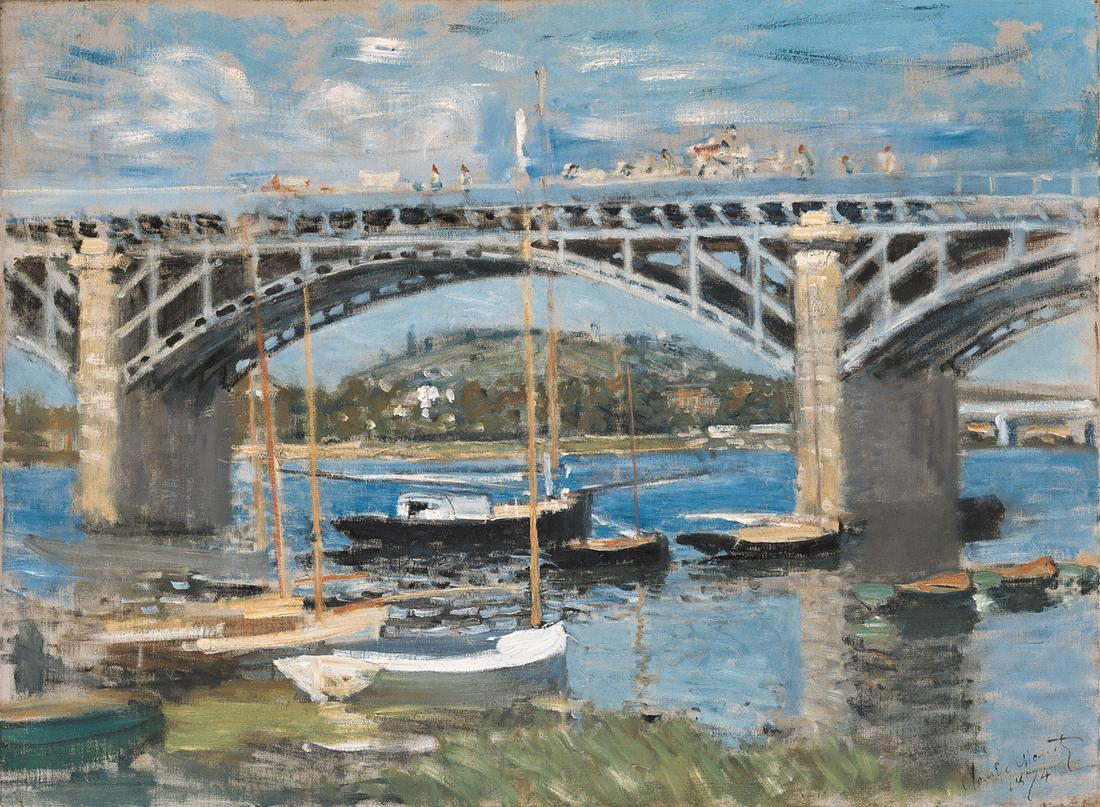
Claude Monet —
The Bridge at Argenteuil

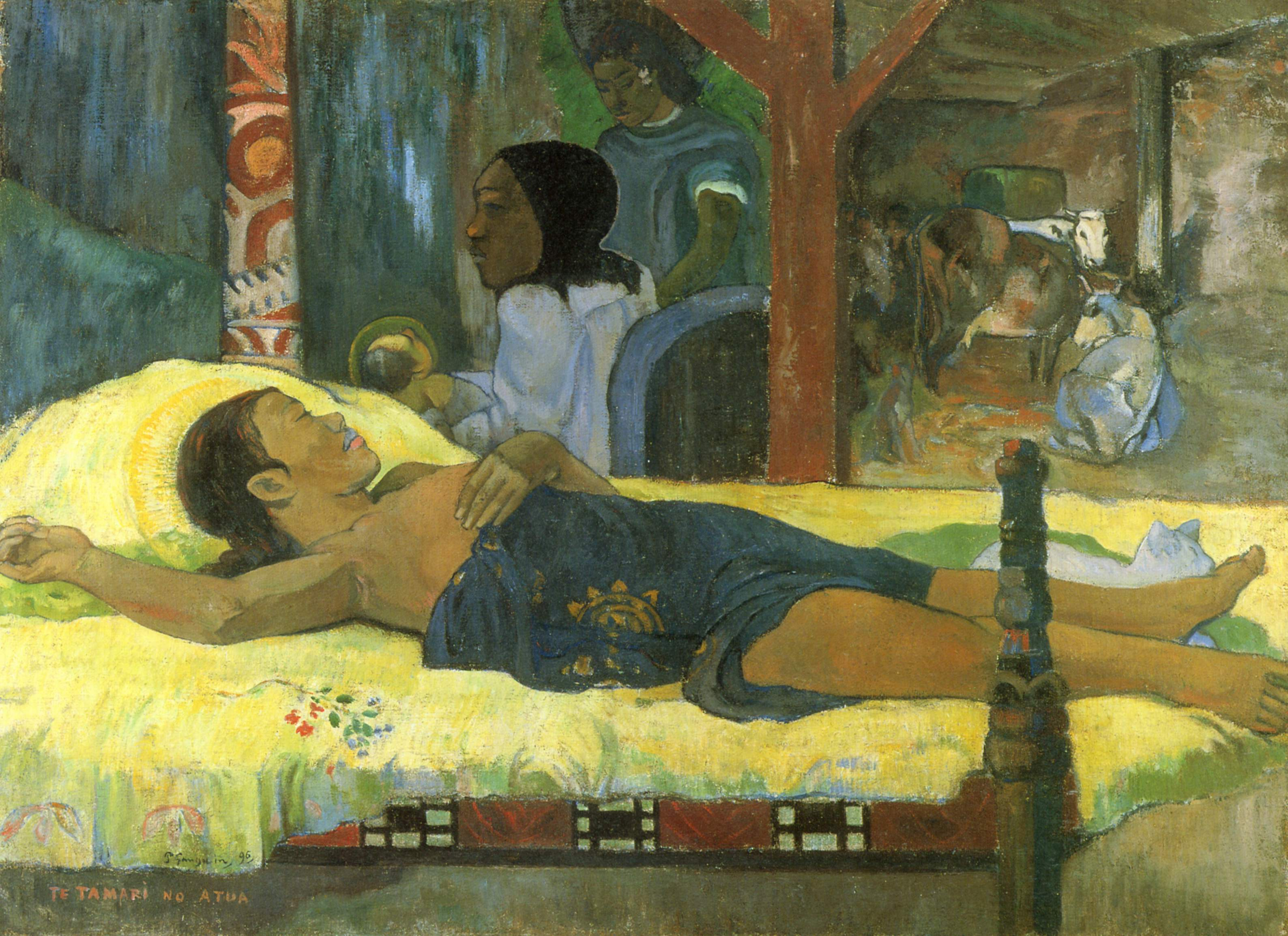
Paul Gauguin —
Te tamari no atua

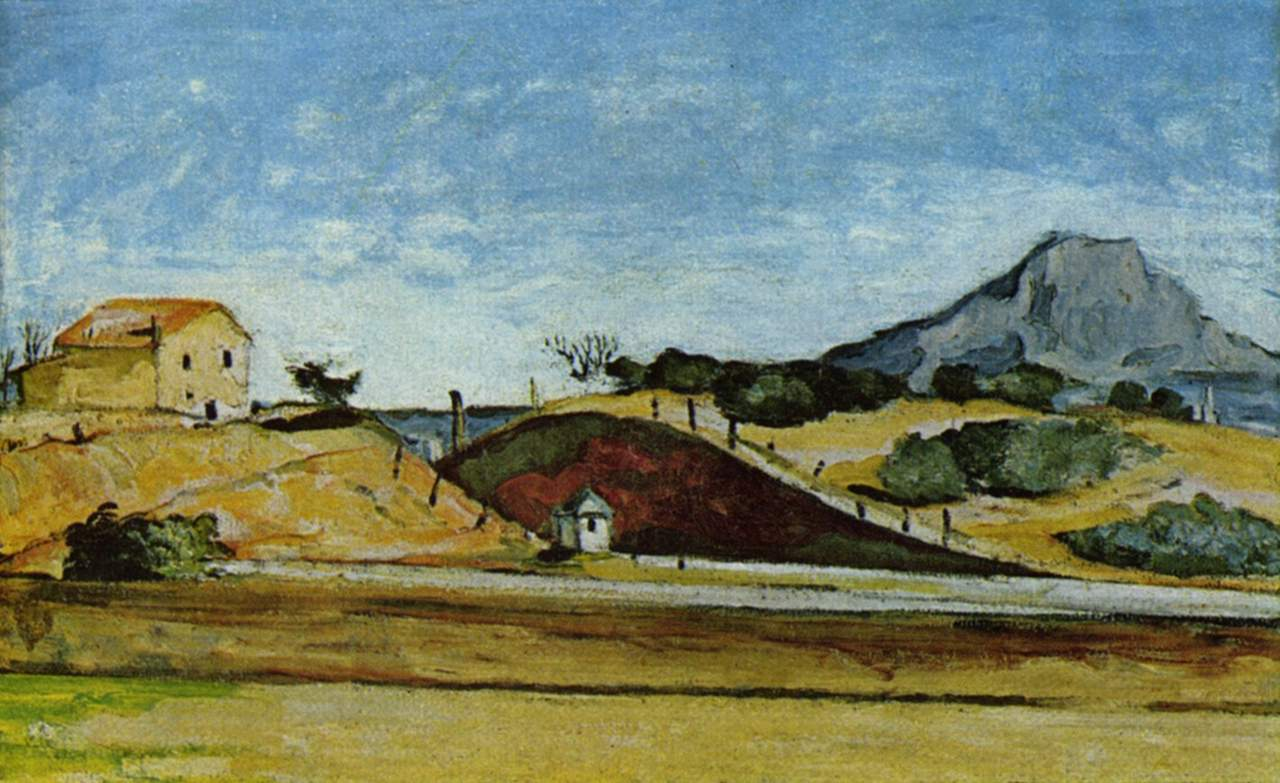
Paul Cézanne —
The railway cutting

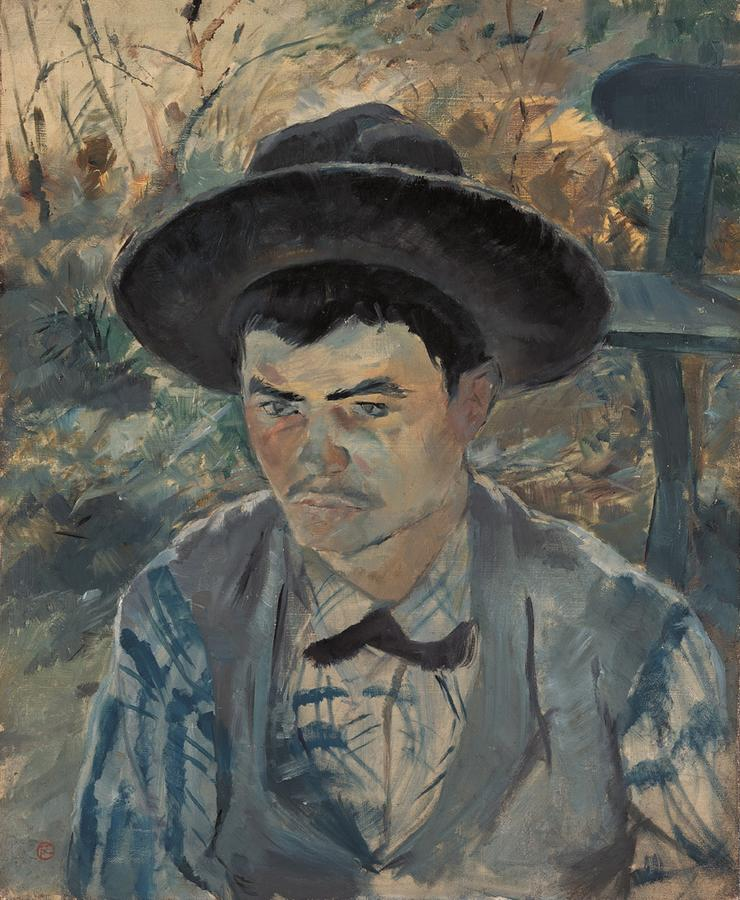
Toulouse-Lautrec —
Le jeune Routy à Céleyran

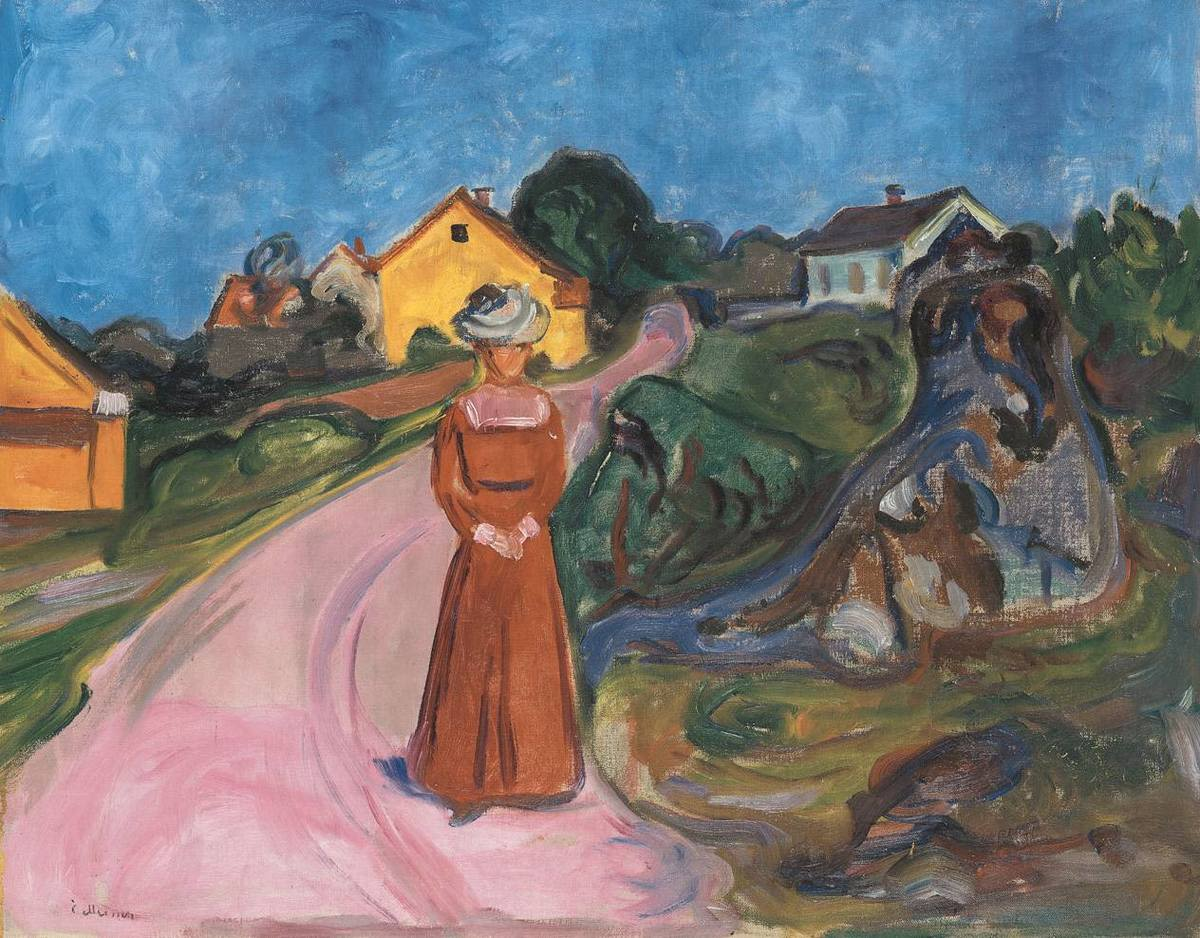
Edvard Munch —
Woman in Red Dress (Street in Åsgårdstrand)

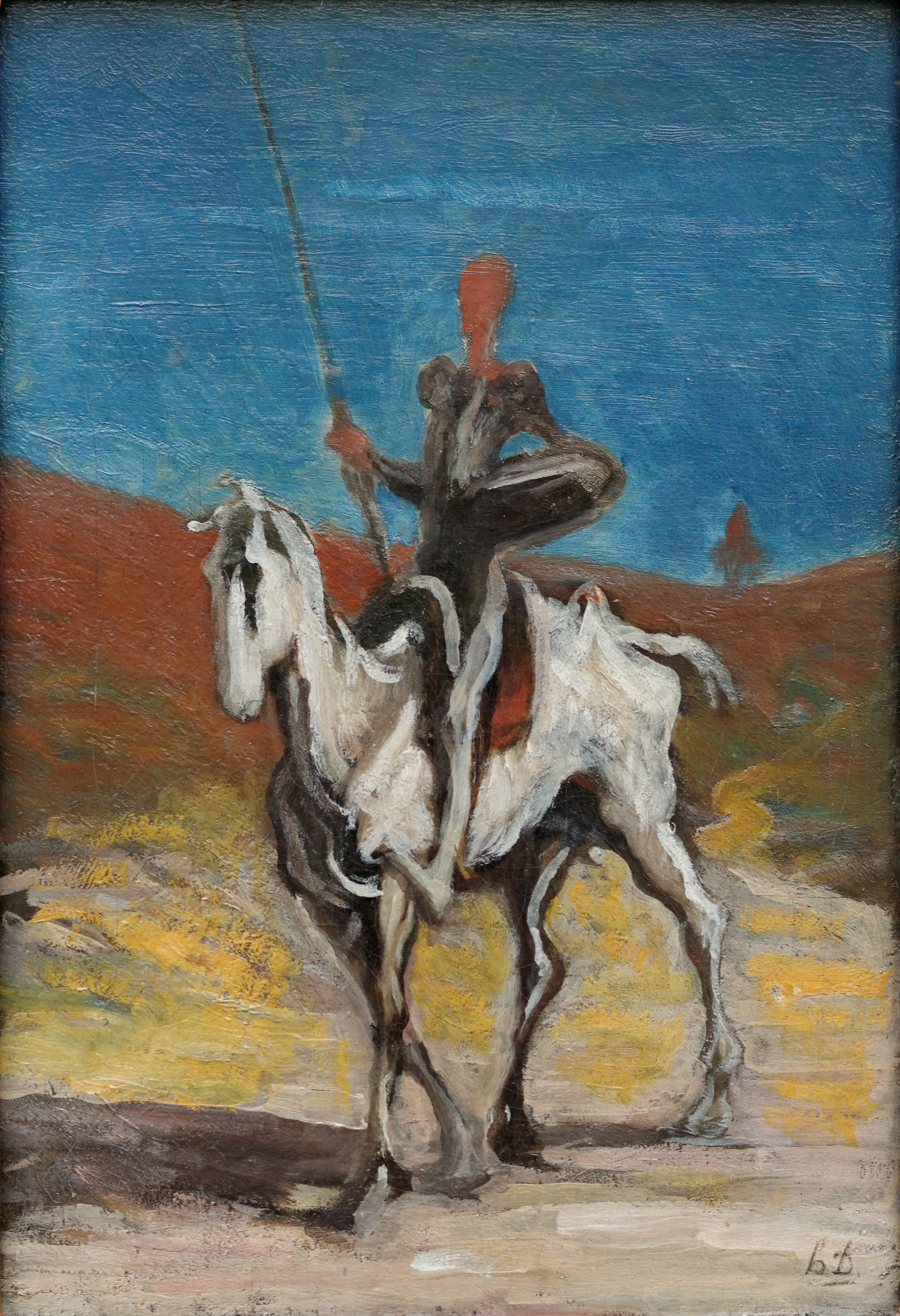
Honoré Daumier —
Don Quichotte and Sancho Pansa c. 1868

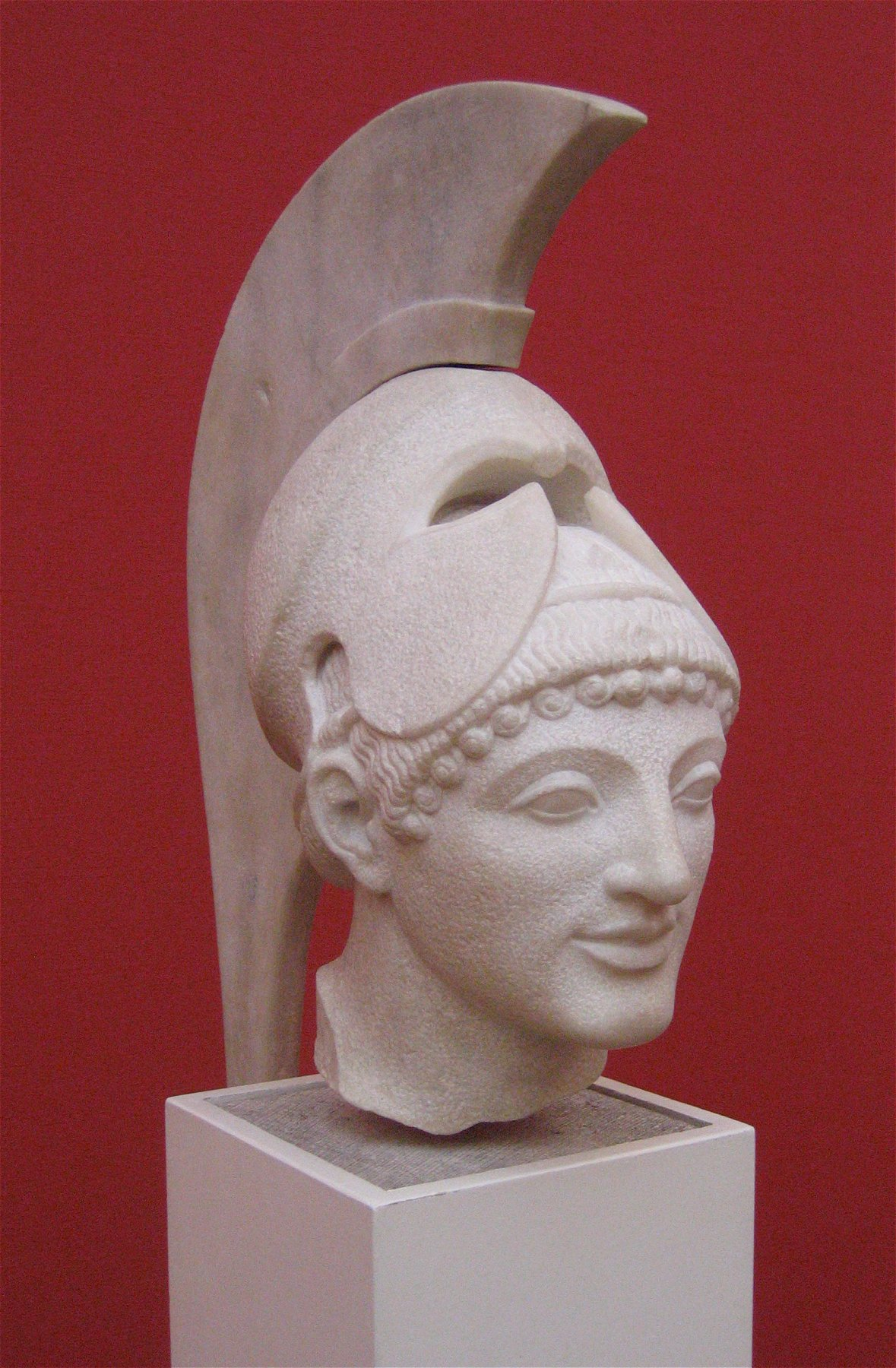
Bertel Thorvaldsen—
Head of a warrior c. 1812

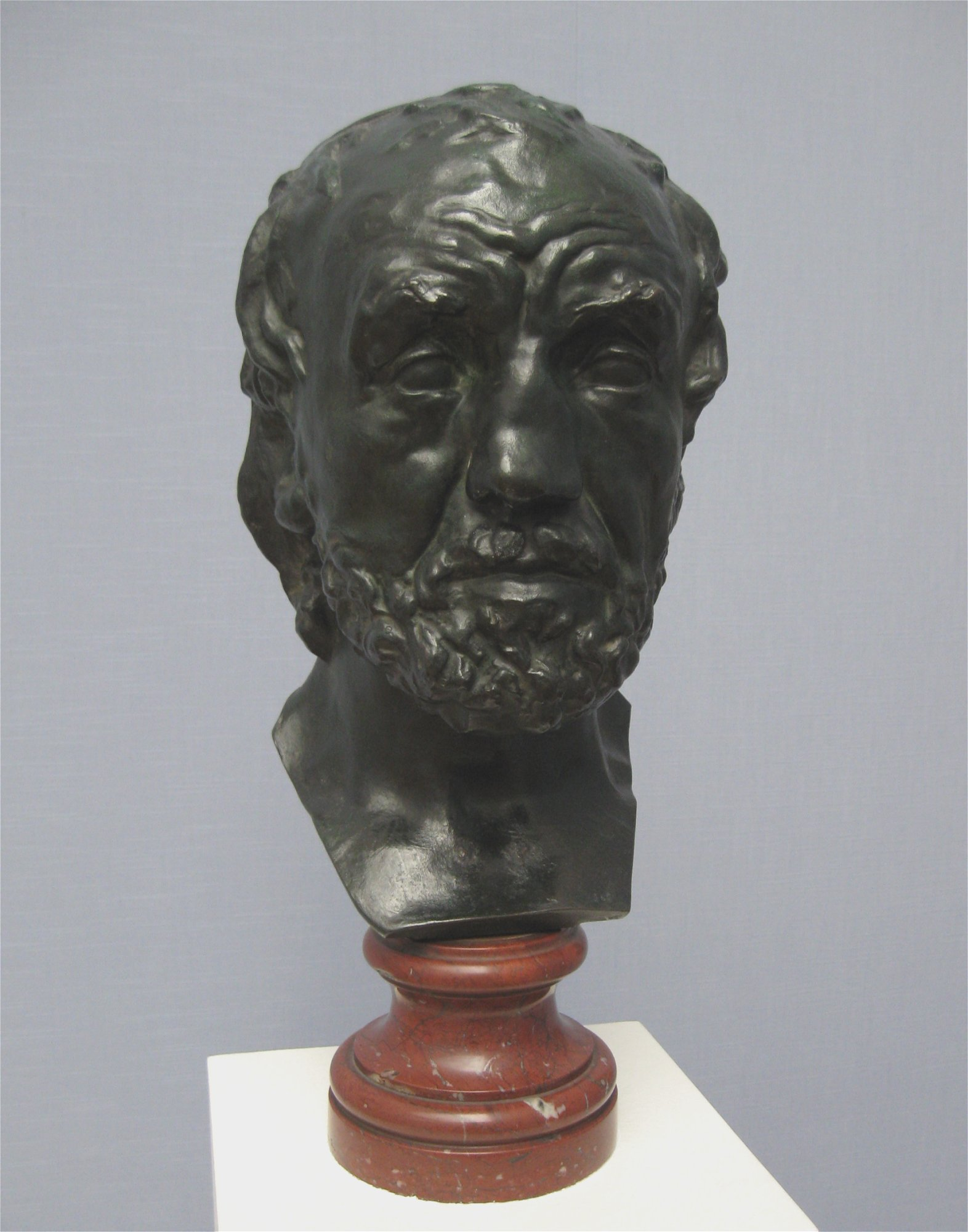
Auguste Rodin—
Man with broken nose c. 1863
