= The Poor Poet =

Painting by Carl Spitzweg

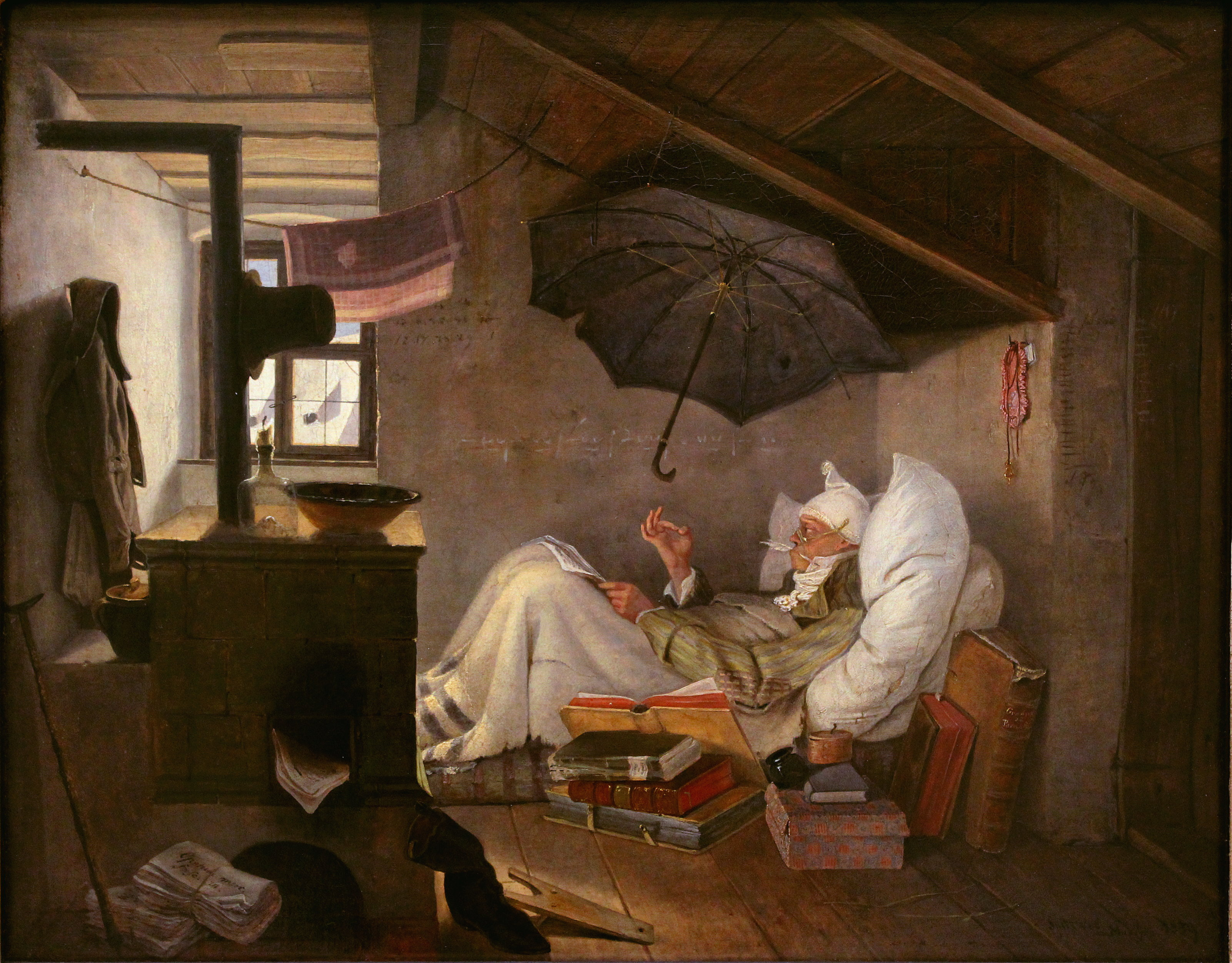
- Artist: Carl Spitzweg
- Year: 1839
- Medium: Oil on canvas
- Dimensions: 36.2 cm × 44.6 cm (14.3 in × 17.6 in)
- Location: Neue Pinakothek, Munich

The Poor Poet (German: Der arme Poet) is the best-known and most popular painting by German painter Carl Spitzweg. It was executed in 1839 and had three versions.

The painting was featured in the 1980 BBC Two series 100 Great Paintings.

== Description ==
The painting depicts a poet in his poor garret room. The narrow room is illuminated by a small window on the left. On the right there are the rafters of the house roof, on which an umbrella hangs, to protect the sleeping area from the moisture dripping through the roof. The room door can be seen on the right edge of the painting. Opposite the door, on the left edge of the picture, there is a green tiled stove without fire. The poor poet has no bed: instead he lies on a mattress against the wall on the floor, in a dressing gown, with a sleeping hat on his head and spectacles on his nose. On his knees he holds some pages of a manuscript with his left hand. With the fingers of his right hand he appears to be counting the meter of a poem – or is he crushing a flea? In front of the mattress, there are thick books and two boxes with an inkwell on them. On the spine of the upright book on the far right are the Latin words: Gradus ad Parnassum (German: Stufen zum Parnass), which is either the title of the main theoretical work published by the Austrian composer Johann Joseph Fux or, most likely, the instructions for writing Latin verses published by the Jesuit priest Paul Aler in Cologne in 1702. On the wall, the poet probably painted the meter of the hexameter in red. There is a candle in the bottle on the green tiled stove, next to it the wash bowl, and a towel hangs on a clothesline above it. A top hat hangs on the unheated stovepipe. There are sheets of paper in the furnace hole, which probably belong to the papers that lie in front of it, and which, also in Latin, are labeled Operum meorum fasciculum III (English: The third bundle of my works). There is also a single boot and a boot jack in front of the stove. To the left of the stove is a pot, a coat is hanging on the wall next to it and a walking stick or crutch is leaning against the wall on the far left of the picture. Snow-covered roofs are seen behind the window, in an indication that it is cold. However, the poet is so poor that he remains in bed to keep himself warm. He can only heat himself if he burns his works.

== Analysis ==
For a long time it was uncertain what the poet was doing with the fingers of his right hand. An obvious assumption is that he is chanting a verse. According to another interpretation, he crushes a flea between his fingers, with which Spitzweg would ironically represent the discrepancy between the poet's claim and his reality.

The subject of "artists in a poor room" was dealt with before Spitzweg. The British painter William Hogarth was the first to deal with this subject in 1736. Spitzweg possibly borrowed his title from the drama by August von Kotzebue, The Poor Poet (1812).

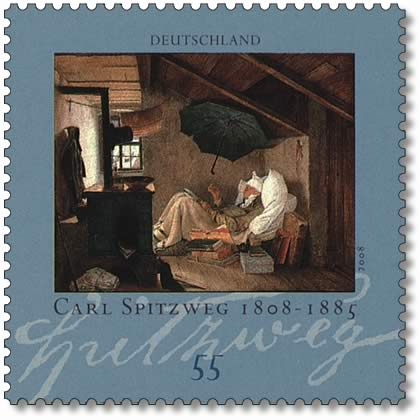
German stamp (2008)

The Poor Poet is Spitzweg's earliest masterpiece. The role model was most likely the German poet Mathias Etenhueber, who lived in Munich from 1722 to 1782 and suffered financial hardships.

== Versions and Thefts ==
There are three completed versions of the painting, all from 1839: the alleged first version is privately owned and used to be on loan to the Germanisches Nationalmuseum in Nuremberg. The best known version is now in the Neue Pinakothek, Munich. This painting was given by Spitzweg to his nephew Ludwig as a gift. He offered it to its current owners in 1887. Another version was held in the National Gallery, Berlin.

This version of the painting, on display in Berlin, was the subject of a political art campaign by Frank Uwe Laysiepen in 1976. He stole the work, but returned it after a few hours.

A second theft was carried out on September 3, 1989. Art thieves stole it together with another one of Spitzweg's works, Der Liebesbrief (The Love Letter), from Charlottenburg Palace. To date, neither of the two paintings has been recovered.

== Cultural references ==
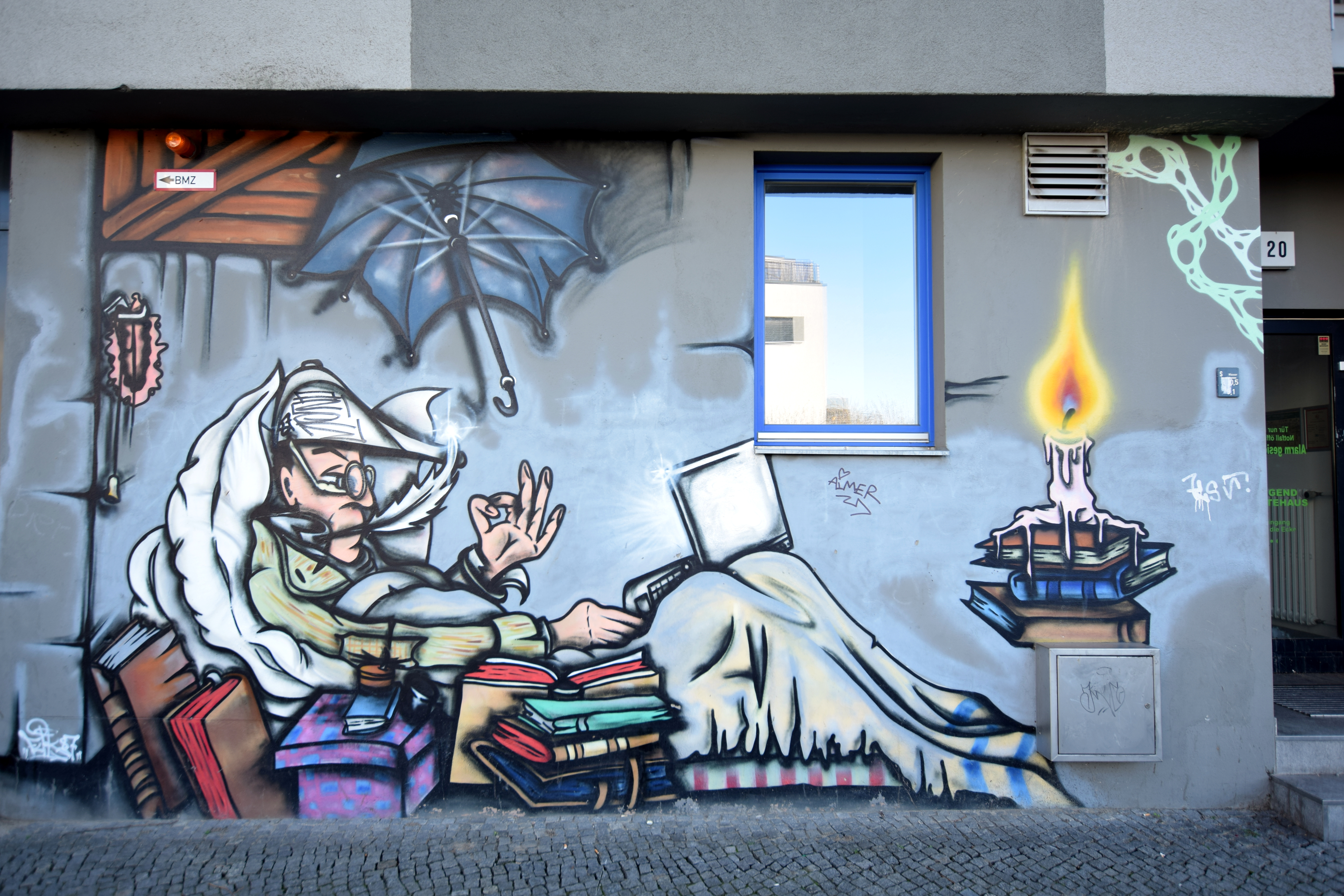
Graffito in Berlin Moabit district (Seydlitzstraße 20)

The painting was the subject of a commemorative stamp issued by the Deutsche Post for the 200th anniversary Spitzweg's birth in 2008. In that same year, the Bundesministerium der Finanzen (Federal Ministry of Finance) adapted the painting's motif into a physical silver €10 commemorative coin, designed by artist Hannes Dauer. The relief directly engraves the reclining poet and his umbrella onto the coin's face.

Sometime before 2021, unidentified artists painted a graffito modeled after Spitzweg's painting on a building in the Moabit district of Berlin, Germany (Seydlitzstraße 20). In the graffito, the "poet" has a laptop and modern clothes.
