= Justitia (Spitzweg) =

Painting by Carl Spitzweg

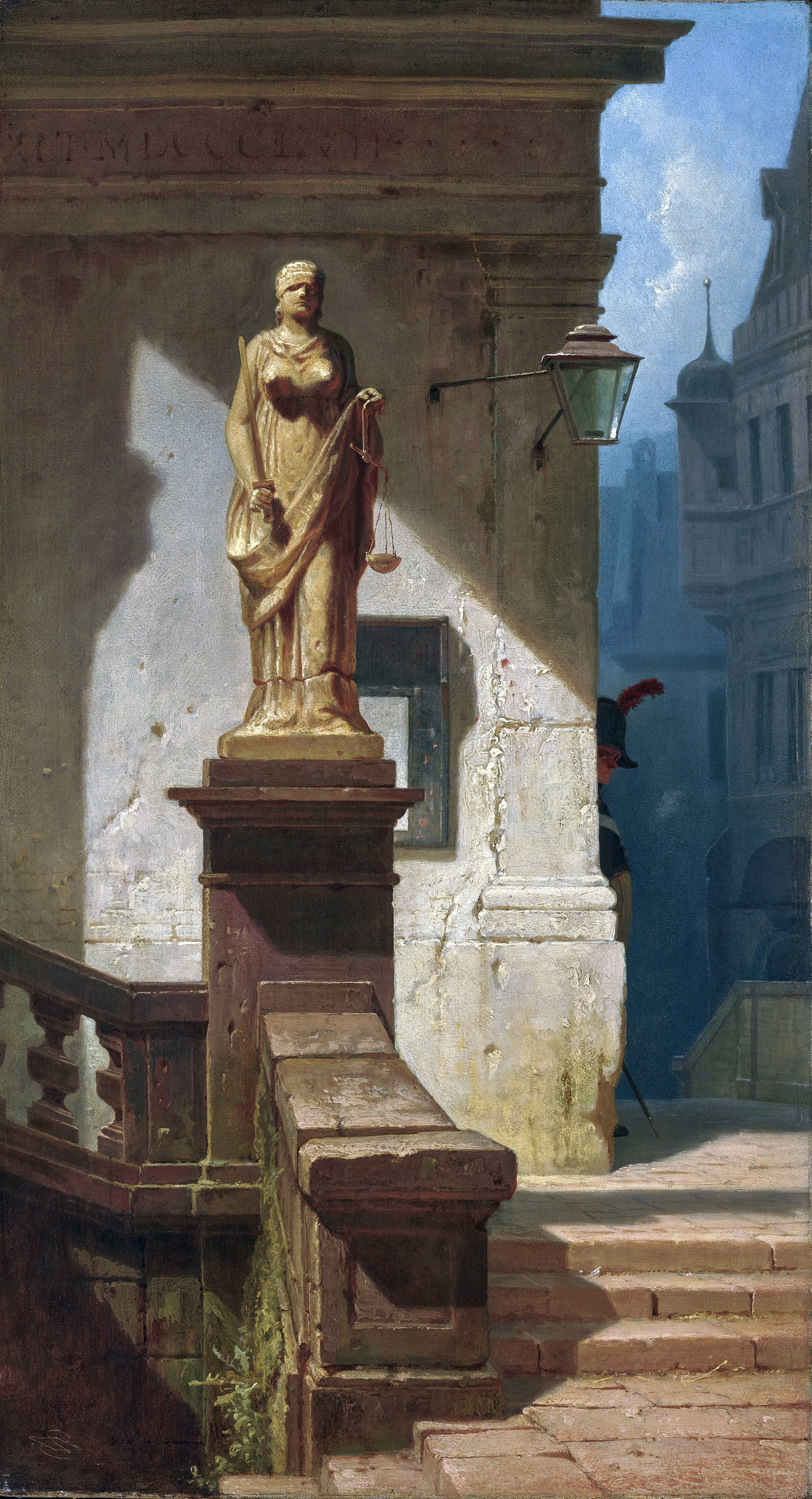
- Artist: Carl Spitzweg
- Year: c. 1857
- Medium: Oil on canvas
- Dimensions: 49 cm × 27 cm (19 in × 11 in)
- Location: Private collection

Justitia, also known as The Eye of the Law, is an oil on canvas painting by German painter Carl Spitzweg, created c. 1857. It is held in a private collection.

== Description ==
The portrait-format painting depicts a statue of Justitia, or Lady Justice, on a pedestal that also forms the cornerstone of a stair railing. Located mostly in the upper left quadrant of the painting and facing the viewer, the statue presents common attributes of Lady Justice: a blindfold, an equal-arm balance in the left hand, a sword held vertically in the right hand, and long robes draped over the body. Carved from light-brown stone, the statue is illuminated by sunlight entering from the upper left. Shadows cast by off-canvas architectural elements are visible on the structure behind the landing, which occupies a large part of the background.

From the upper end of the column's shadow, a line slopes diagonally to the right, above which the wall is in shadow while the lower part is in sunlight. The division into light and shadow areas of the wall runs behind the statue at approximately chest height. At the corner of the building on the right there is a person, standing behind this corner that is only partially visible. Visible are his helmet with feathers, a uniformed upper body, the tip of a sword or stick and the tip of a foot. The man, possibly a soldier, is apparently standing in the shadows on the landing to guard the building.

On the right edge of the painting, there is another railing, the slope of which shows that there is also a staircase leading down on the other side of the building. The background on the right side of the painting shows urban architecture under a greenish lit sky. There is an unlit lantern on the building shown at the level of Lady Justice. Behind Lady Justice's lower legs there is a dark brown display box or bulletin board on the wall of the house, on which there is a written sheet of paper.

The base part of Justitia belongs to a staircase that seems to lead further up on the left and shows three steps in the foreground on the right that are parallel to the lower edge of the picture. From the viewer's perspective, these lead up to the level where the guard stands and from which the notice could be read. Below these steps you can see another landing on the right, to which another staircase apparently leads up from the bottom left. However, this is only indicated by a single step at the bottom. Overgrown masonry below the railing in the lower left corner of the painting also suggests that there is another area in the area below. This lower part of the image shows dark brownish tones, while the landing and steps on the right, which are largely exposed to sunlight, show light, more ocher tones.

The painting can be considered not without some ironical intent, since the sculpture shows some cracks in its foundation, while she also holds broken scales and wears a somewhat disarranged blindfold. The look of the soldier at the viewer also seems suspicious.

== Provenance ==
Spitzweg's Justitia came into the spotlight in 2007 when the Federal Ministry of Finance agreed to return it to the heirs of the former owner Jewish art collector Leo Bendel, who was forced to sell his collection after the Nazi rise to power, and had died at Buchenwald concentration camp, on March 30, 1940.

Two paintings from Bendel art collection, Justitia and The Warlock in the Heinemann Gallery on June 15, 1937. The gallery paid Bendel 16,000 marks for the current painting. Later, the painting was resold for 25,000 marks to the art dealer Maria Almas. In October 1945, it came to the Central Collecting Point in Munich. The painting's provenance was checked back then, but was apparently found to be unproblematic. The painting was handed to the Federal President's Office on August 1, 1961, and was hung in the Villa Hammerschmidt, in Bonn, with no further inspections taking place. In 2006, Blendel heirs shown to German President Horst Köhler the circumstances under which Leo Bendel was forced to sell it. After an inspection, the Federal Office for Central Services and Unresolved Property Issues suggested that the Federal Ministry of Finance should return the picture to them. Initially there was no noticeable public reaction until a magazine reported the case in March 2007. The Federal Ministry of Finance then gave his approval to the return of the painting to Blendel heirs. The painting was later auctioned in May 2020 at the Neumeister Munich auction house for £550,000 euros and was sold to a German private collector.

== See also ==
- List of claims for restitution for Nazi-looted art
