= Leo Bendel =

German Jewish art collector (1868–1940)

Leo Bendel (born 1868 in Strezwo, Poland, then Galicia, Austria-Hungary; died 30 March 1940 in Buchenwald concentration camp) was an Austrian-born German Jewish tobacco dealer and art collector.

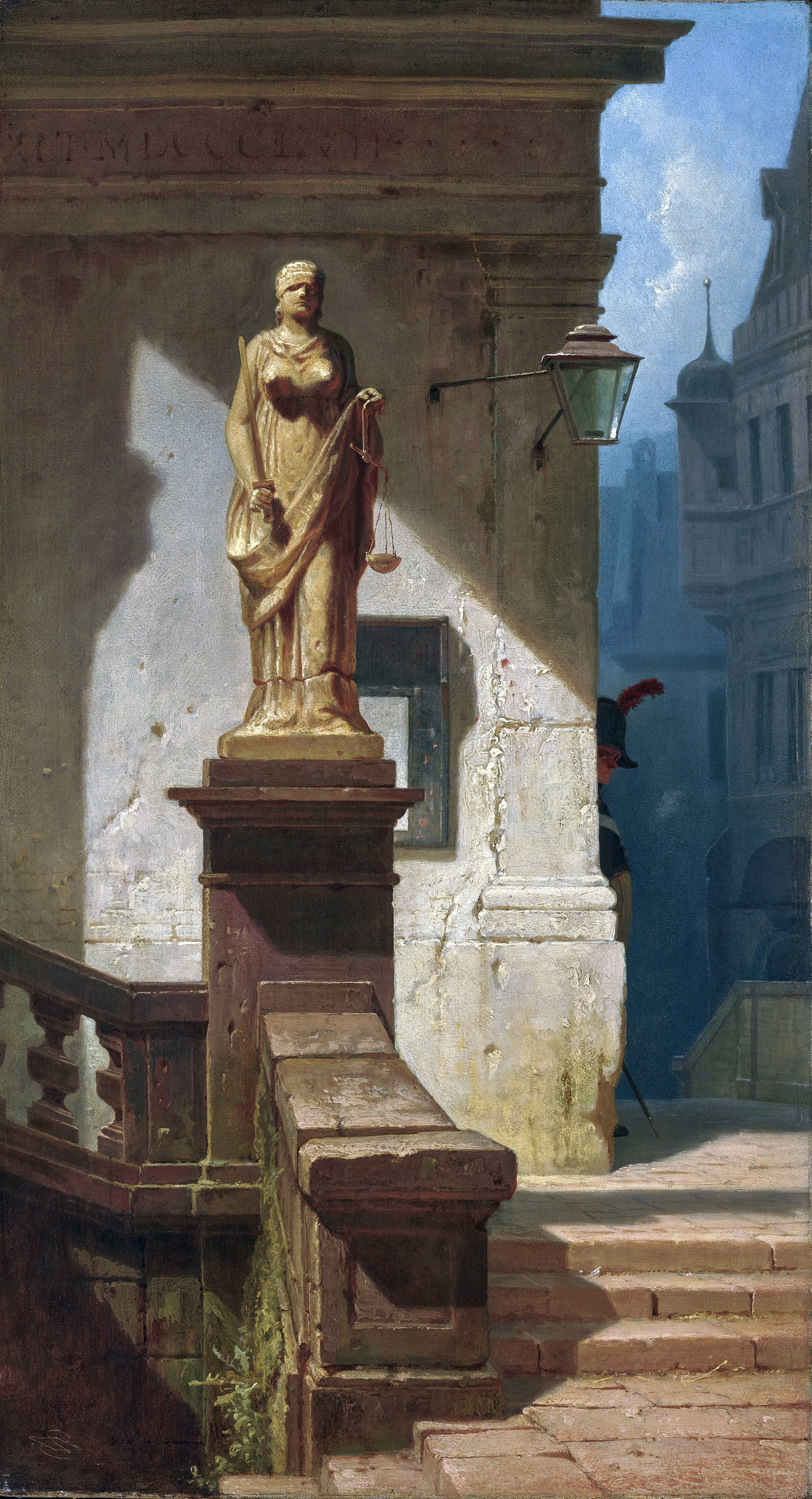
Carl Spitzweg: Das Auge des Gesetzes

Bendel came to Berlin from Galicia around 1900 and became a tobacco dealer there. He was considered to be well-off, lived in Berlin-Dahlem and acquired several paintings and graphics over the years.

== Nazi persecution ==
After the Nazis came to power in 1933, Bendel was persecuted because of his Jewish origins. In 1935 he was dismissed from the position of general agent for the Job Cigarette Papers company because he was Jewish. Together with his wife Else Bendel, he fled Nazi Germany, and between 1935 and 1937 he sold his art collection to finance his escape. In the summer of 1937 Leo and Else Bendel went to Vienna. After the annexation of Austria in 1938, Bendel was arrested at the beginning of September 1939 and deported to the Buchenwald concentration camp near Weimar. He died there in the spring of 1940.

Else Bendel survived as a non-Jew under poor conditions in Vienna. After the war she made claims for compensation in Berlin; her application had not yet been decided when she died in September 1957. However, it was posthumously rejected.

== The art collection and claims for restitution ==
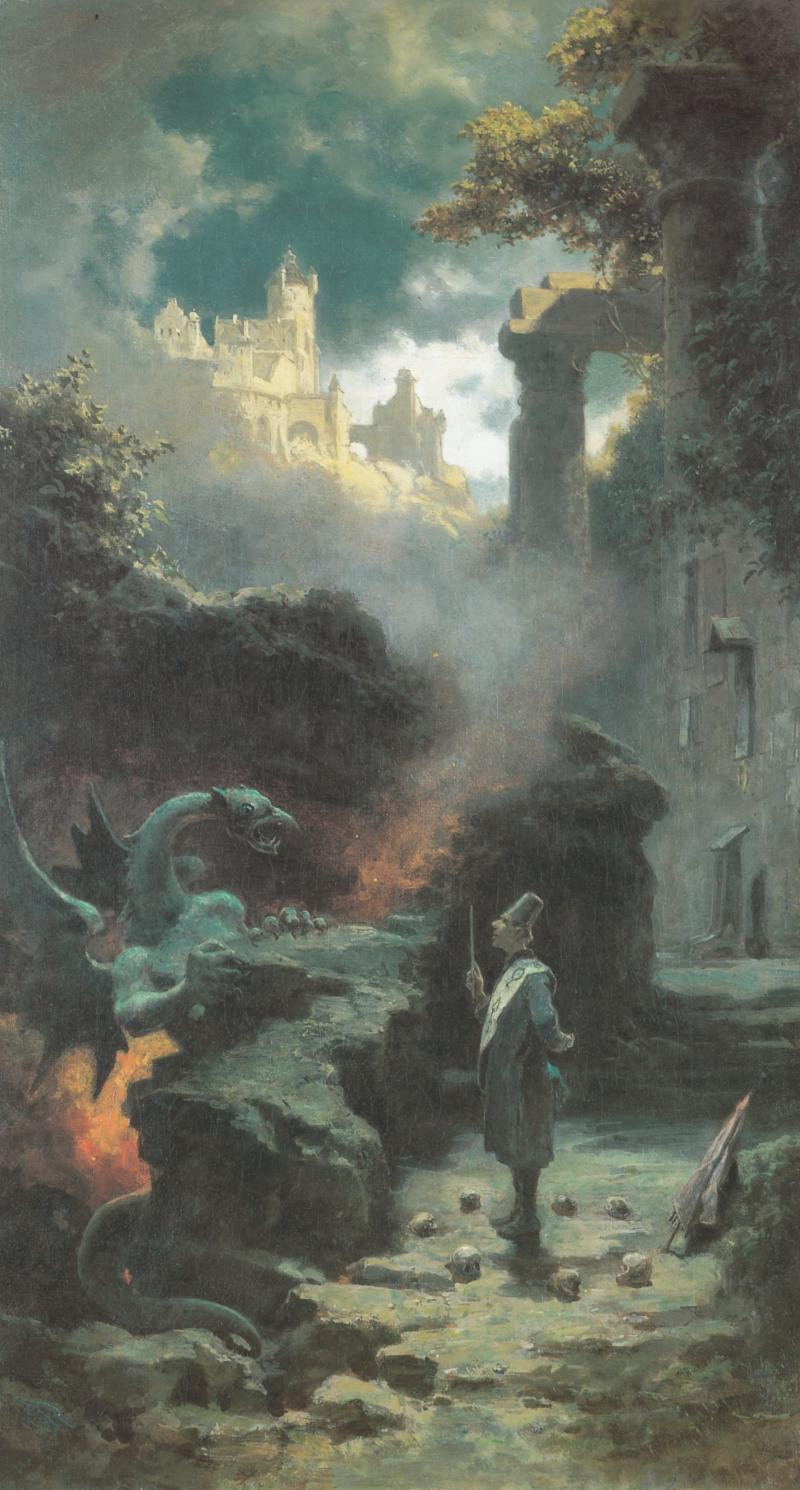
Carl Spitzweg: Der Hexenmeister, 1880

Leo Bendel's collection consisted of paintings, drawings, watercolors and etchings by Carl Spitzweg, Wilhelm Trübner, Walter Leistikow and Hans Thoma. To this day, two of the paintings by Carl Spitzweg are best known:

- Carl Spitzweg, The Eye of the Law (Justitia) ("Das Auge des Gesetzes"), 1857, oil on canvas

Leo Bendel sold the painting under duress to the Heinemann Gallery in Munich in 1937 for RM 16,000. In 1938 the notorious Nazi art dealer Maria Almas Dietrich bought it for the planned Führer Museum in Linz for RM 25,000. In October 1945, after being seized by Allied troops, it was taken to the Central Collecting Point in Munich. In August 1961 it was given to the Federal President's Office via the Foreign Office's trust company and became the permanent interior of Villa Hammerschmidt in Bonn. It decorated the office of eight German presidents. In May 2006, the heirs Leo and Else Bendel applied for restitution in accordance with the Washington Declaration. The Federal Office for Central Services and Unresolved Property Issues examined the matter, determined the "loss due to persecution" and proposed the return, which took place in 2007 .

- Carl Spitzweg, The Warlock (Der Hexenmeister), 1875 / 1880, oil on canvas

Leo Bendel also sold this painting in 1937 to the Heinemann Gallery in Munich for RM 18,000; in August 1937 it was acquired by Caroline Oetker from Bielefeld, wife of the baking powder manufacturer and Nazi August OetkerAugust Oetker, and passed on to her grandson Rudolf August Oetker.
In June 2006, the Bendel heirs contacted the Rudolf August Oetker GmbH art collection, which owns the painting, and initiated a discussion to negotiate a fair and equitable solution in accordance with the Washington Declaration. However, the Oetker Kunstsammlung GmbH refused any discussion. In October 2016, the Oetker Group announced that the art collection was being examined for any looted art. In November 2019, the Rudolf-August Oetker GmbH art collection returned the painting to the descendants of the Jewish collector Leo Bendel. The restitution was preceded by a long international search for the rightful heirs of the original owner who had been murdered by the National Socialists.

== Literature ==
- Monika Tatzkow: Leo Bendel (1868–1940) Berlin; in: Melissa Müller, Monika Tatzkow: Verlorene Bilder, verlorene Leben. Jüdische Sammler und was aus ihren Kunstwerken wurde, München 2009, ISBN 978-3-938045-30-5
- Gunnar Schnabel, Monika Tatzkow: Nazi Looted Art. Handbuch. Kunstrestitution weltweit, Berlin 2007, ISBN 978-3-00-019368-2

== See also ==
- List of claims for restitution for Nazi-looted art
- The Holocaust
- History of Jews in Germany
