= The Intercepted Love Letter =

Painting by Carl Spitzweg

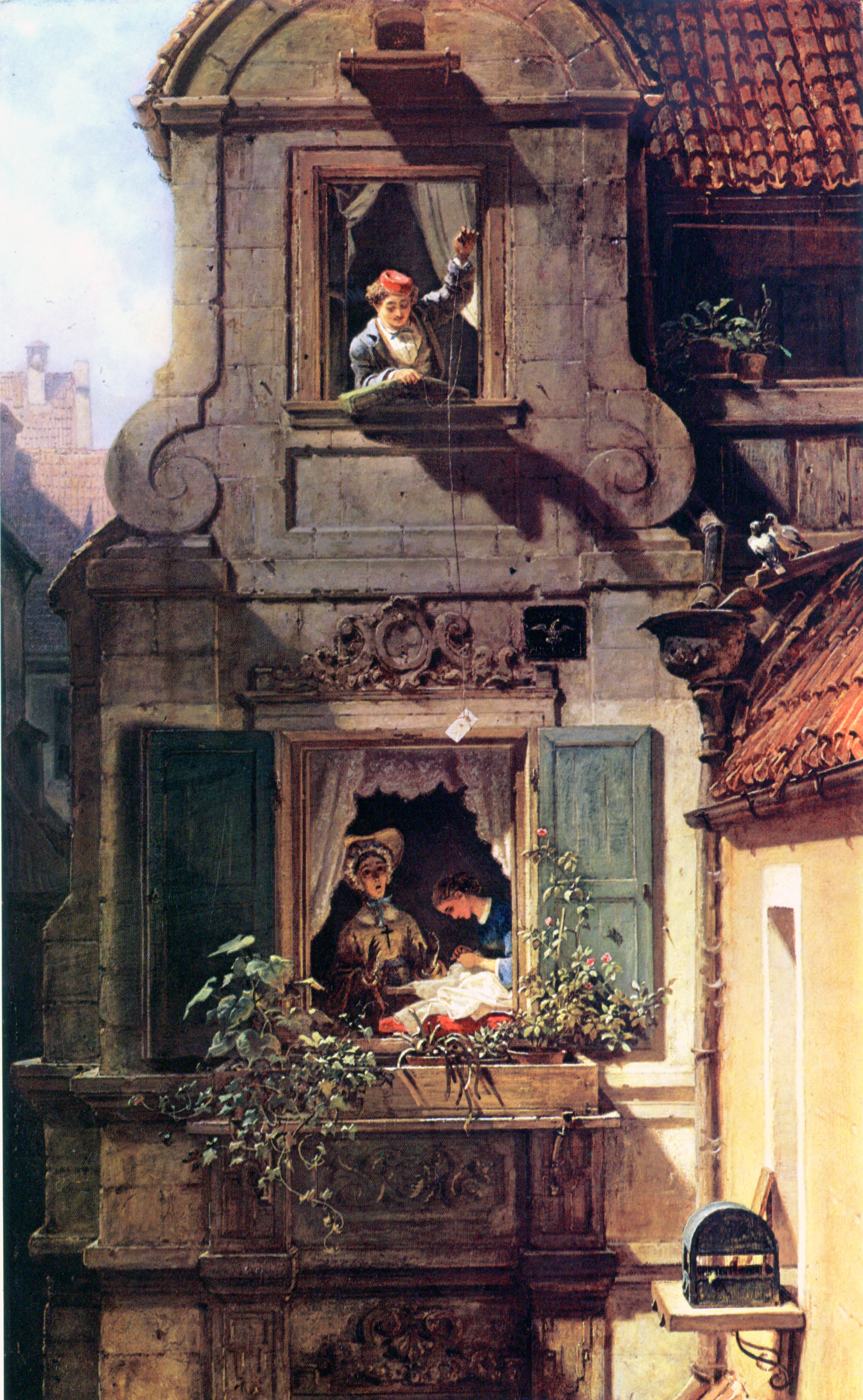
- Artist: Carl Spitzweg
- Year: c. 1860
- Medium: Oil-on-canvas
- Dimensions: 54,2 cm × 32,3 cm (213 in × 127 in)
- Location: Museum Georg Schäfer; Schweinfurt

The Intercepted Love Letter (German: Der abgefangene Liebesbrief) is an oil-on-canvas painting by German painter Carl Spitzweg. It was painted c. 1860 and its now housed at the Museum Georg Schäfer, in Schweinfurt, Germany.

== Description ==
The painting depicts a student, recognizable by his cap, the Cerevis, who uses a thread to lower a sealed love letter to the open window of the apartment under his room. In the lower window, viewers can see a young woman so busy with her handwork that she does not notice the letter. Another woman, probably her aunt or governess, notices the letter and opens her mouth in astonishment. The scene is filled with the sense of humour and irony typical of Spitzweg.

The sand-colored facade is richly structured, oblique shadows show that the scene takes place in a town with narrow streets. Spitzweg also added small details to the picture: a bird cage, the Phoenix Insurance Shield and a couple of pigeons, in an ironic metaphor for the two youngsters.
