= The Warlock (Spitzweg) =

Painting by Carl Spitzweg

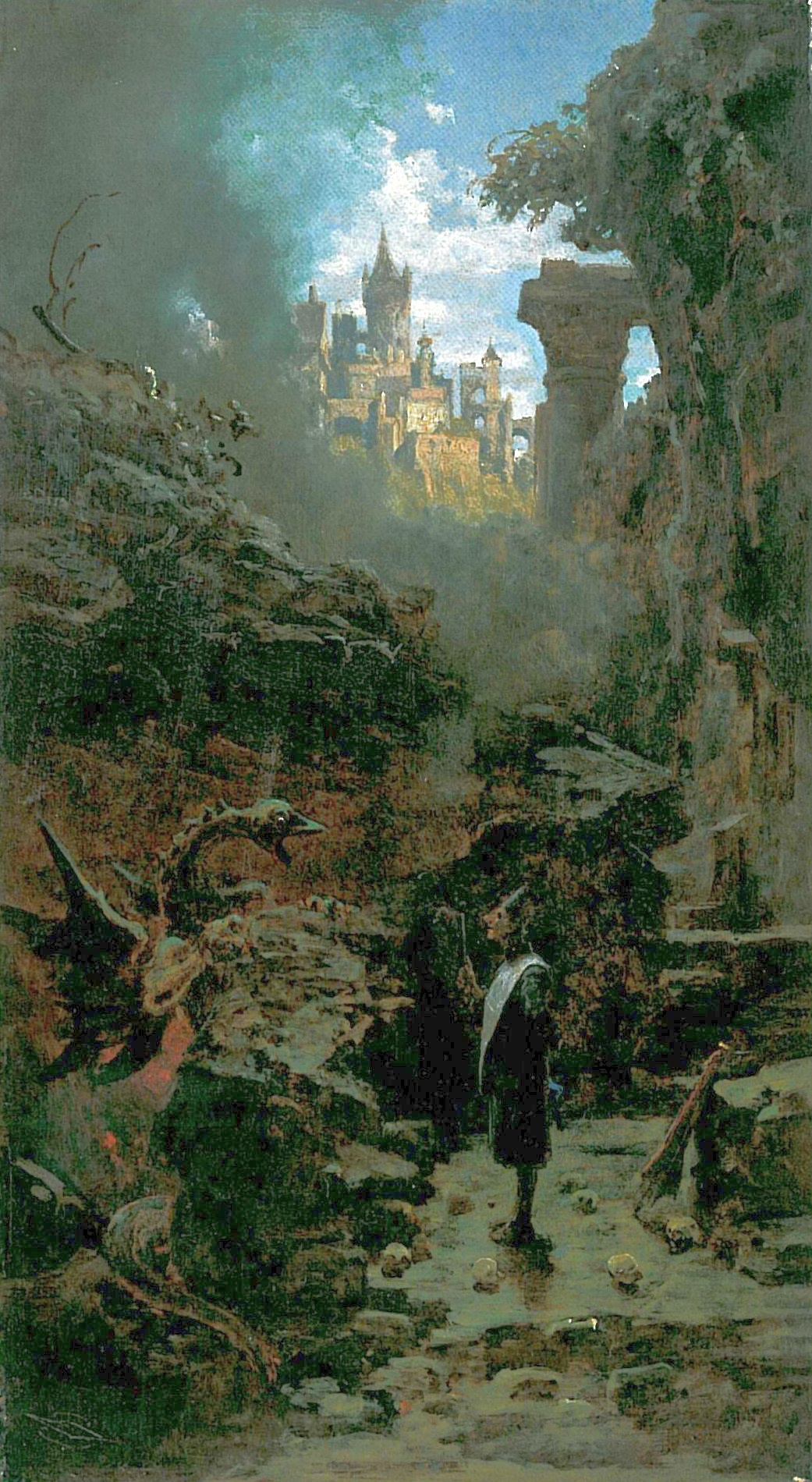
- Artist: Carl Spitzweg
- Year: 1875
- Medium: Oil on canvas
- Dimensions: 29.8 cm × 21.9 cm (11.7 in × 8.6 in)
- Location: Museum Georg Schäfer, Schweinfurt

The Warlock, also known as The Wizard and the Dragon, is the title of two oil on canvas paintings by German painter Carl Spitzweg, from 1875 and 1880. The original painting is now held in the Museum Georg Schäfer, in Schweinfurt, while the other is in the Lucas Museum of Narrative Art in Los Angeles, California. The two paintings are almost identical in motif but differ in size and color.

== Description ==
In the lower half of the painting, a warlock stands in the middle of a dark rocky landscape. Around him six or seven skulls were arranged in a circle. He has his staff held high in a pose similar to a schoolmaster or a tamer. In front of him, a not very large dragon rises with its mouth open, clinging to a boulder with its front paws, around which its snake-like tail is wrapped. The mythical animal black wings stand out against a red glow that comes from the underground, probably from a crevice in the rock. Thick, lead-gray smoke curls above it, behind which a sunlit fairytale castle becomes visible next to a towering column. The castle is not unlike Neuschwanstein Castle, whose construction had begun in 1869. The artist's monogram signature, the stylized S, can be found at the bottom left of the painting.

== Reception ==
Ursula Seibold-Bultmann, writing in the Neue Zürcher Zeitung, sees the dragon as the Fáfnir, from the Nordic mythology and the painting as a swipe at “the Wagner enthusiasm of the Bavarian King Ludwig II".

== Provenance ==
The smaller of the two paintings, measuring 29.8 × 21.9 centimeters, has the catalog raisonné number 1394 and was handed over to the Georg Schäfer Museum in Schweinfurt, where it has been on display since 2000.

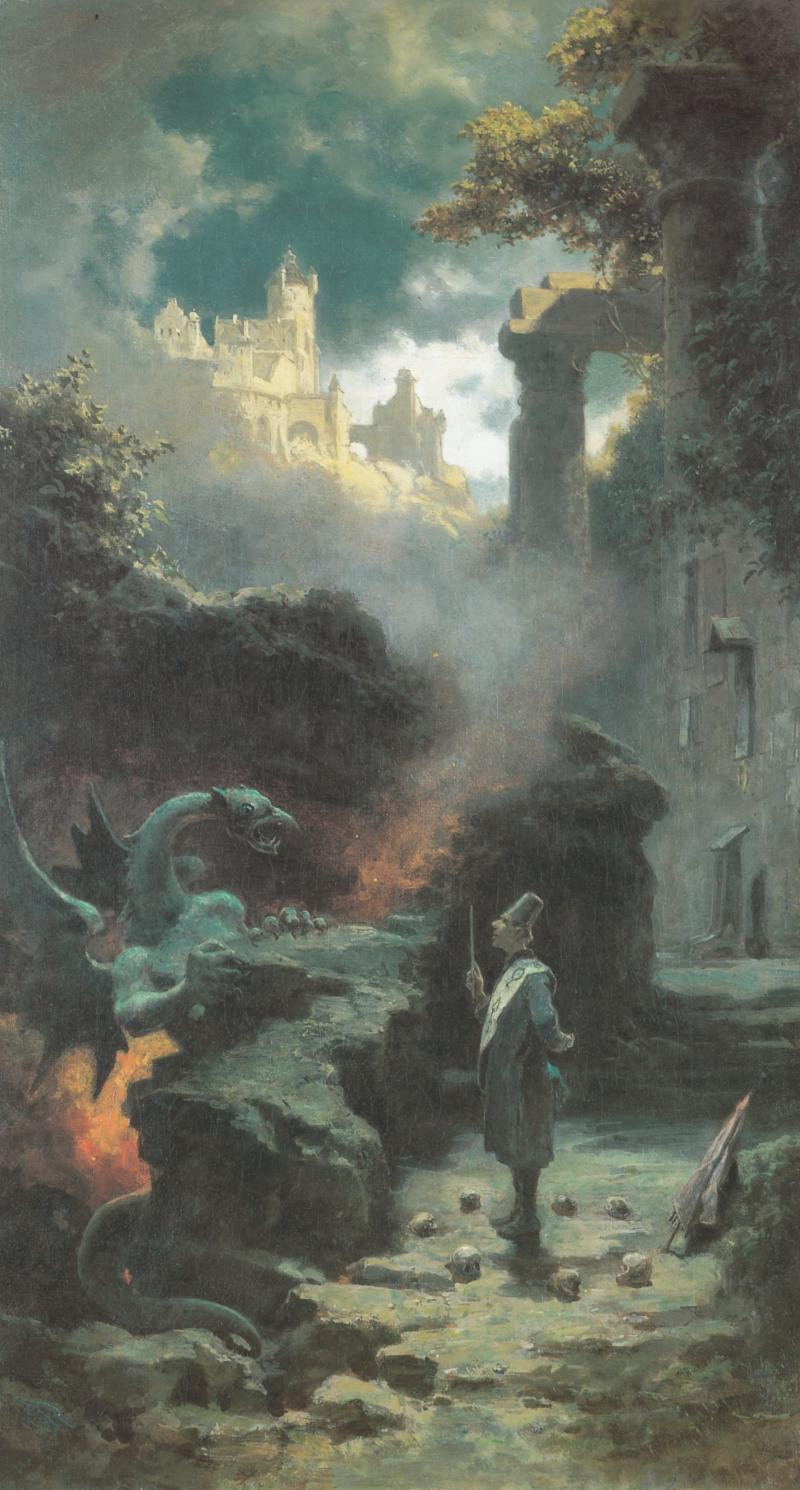
The second version (c. 1880)

The larger painting measures 47.1 × 26.2 centimeters and has the catalog raisonné number 1395. In the early 1930s it was in the art collection of the Jewish industrialist Leo Bendel. He faced persecution after the Nazis came to power, in 1933. He and his wife Else had to sell furniture and works of art below value in order to raise funds for emigration. Bendel sold The Warlock on June 15, 1937, for 18,000 Reichsmarks to the Heinemann Gallery in Munich. This process, similar to others taken by Jewish art collectors at the time, is legally viewed as a loss of property due to persecution, and the painting can be therefore considered as Nazi looted art. On August 12, 1937, the wife of baking powder manufacturer August Oetker, Lina Oetker, purchased the painting for 28,000 Reichsmarks. In 1968 it came to Rudolf-August Oetker through inheritance; since its founding, it was the property of the Rudolf August Oetker GmbH art collection.

In June 2006, the Bendel heirs contacted Kunstsammlung GmbH and initiated a conversation to negotiate a “fair and equitable solution” in accordance with the Washington Declaration. However, Kunstsammlung GmbH refused any conversation. In October 2016, the Oetker Group announced that the art collection was being examined in search of possible stolen art and that The Warlock would probably be returned. In November 2019, the Rudolf-August Oetker GmbH art collection returned the painting to the heirs of the Jewish art collector Leo Bendel, who had been murdered by the Nazis.

== See also ==
- List of claims for restitution for Nazi-looted art
