= Carl Spitzweg =

German painter (1808–1885)

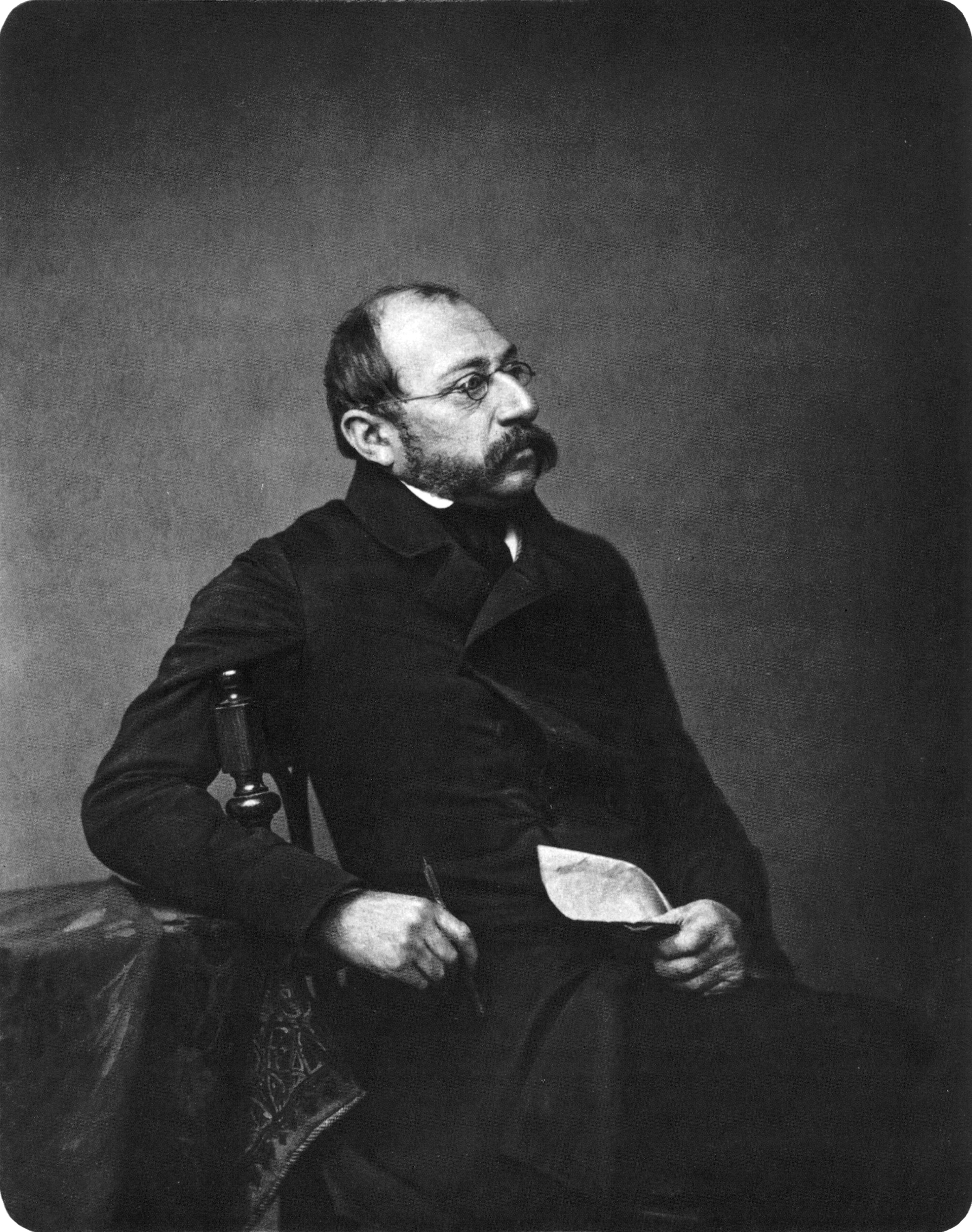
- Carl Spitzweg in a photograph taken c. 1860
- Born: February 5, 1808; Munich, Kingdom of Bavaria, Confederation of the Rhine
- Died: September 23, 1885 (aged 77); Munich, Kingdom of Bavaria, German Empire
- Known for: Painter, poet, artist
- Movement: German Romanticism, Biedermeier

Signature
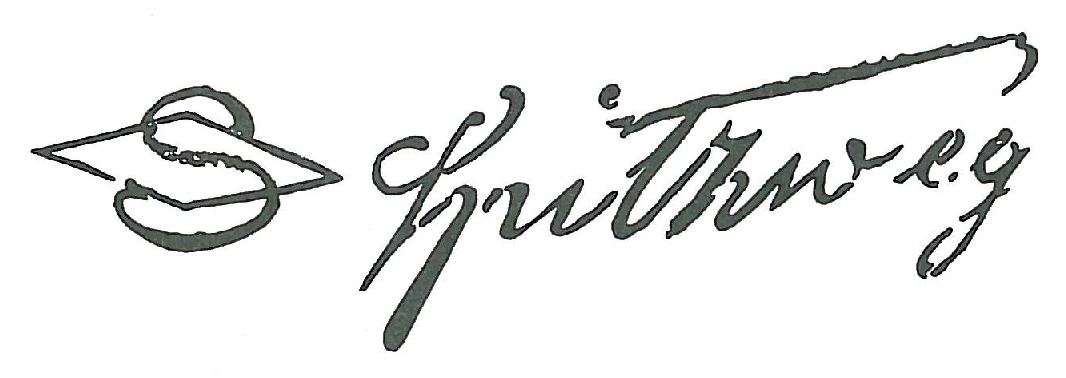

Carl Spitzweg (February 5, 1808 – September 23, 1885) was a German romantic painter, especially of genre subjects. He is considered to be one of the most important artists of the Biedermeier era.

== Life and career ==
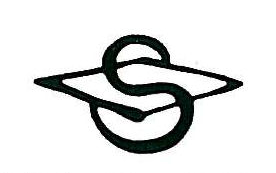
Spitzweg monogram, which he often used to sign his paintings

Spitzweg was born in Munich, Bavaria, the second of three sons of Franziska (née Schmutzer) and Simon Spitzweg. His mother belonged to Munich's upper middle class as the daughter of a wealthy fruit wholesaler. The family's property at Neuhausergasse (today: Neuhauser Straße) 14 was a stately property that later gave Carl Spitzweg financial independence through his inheritance. Carl's father came from the village of Unterpfaffenhofen near the town of Fürstenfeldbruck in today's Fürstenfeldbruck district (in Upper Bavaria), where his family had become wealthy. Until 1807, Spitzweg's father's business base was the trade in spices in Munich. His relatives controlled thriving fruit businesses. Simon Spitzweg was an educated businessman who gained respect and reputation in Munich through his political activities. Carl Spitzweg had two brothers whose careers were just as determined by their father as his own. The eldest, Simon, was to take over the business, Carl was to become a pharmacist and the youngest, Eduard, was to become a doctor.

In Munich, he suffered under his strict father, who tried to forbid him from drawing. After his mother died, in 1819, in same year, his father married his late wife's sister, Maria Krescence. She took great care of Carl and defended him against his father.

From 1819, Carl Spitzweg attended the Munich college and went through the two Latin preparatory classes and the two preparatory classes with varying degrees of success. In 1824, he left the high school, today's Wilhelmsgymnasium, after the second (of four) high school years.

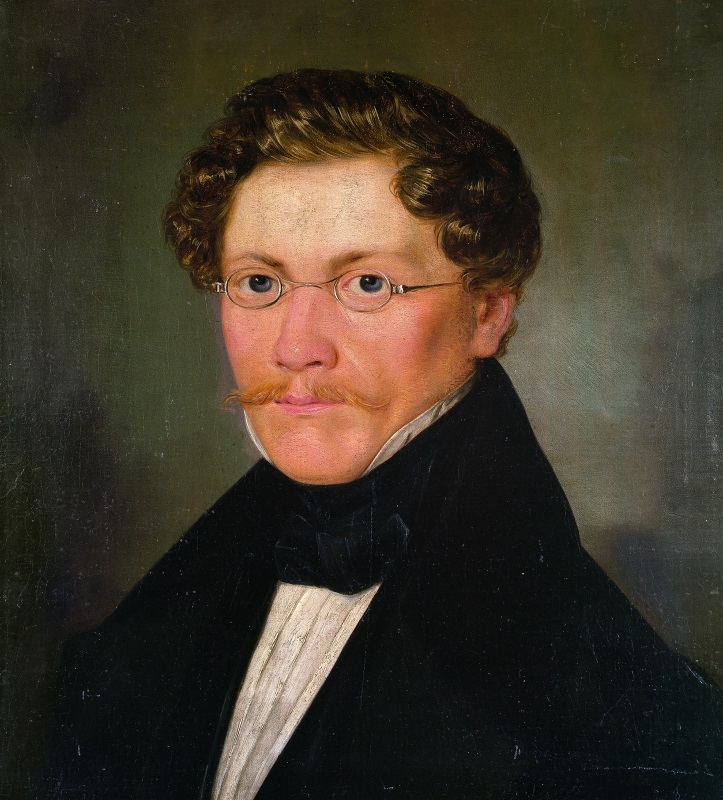
Self-Portrait (c. 1842)

Although his artistic talent was early, with his first drawing from 1823, Carl Spitzweg was obedient to his father and began his apprenticeship in the "city pharmacy" with Sigmund Lober in February 1825. On December 1, 1828, during the last year of his apprenticeship, his father died.

In 1829, he worked in the "Löwenapotheke" in the city of Straubing. He lived there for a year, and was acquainted with theater people and painters. The same year, his eldest brother died working as a merchant in Alexandria, Egypt.

Spitzweg began studying pharmacy, botany and chemistry at the Ludwig-Maximilians-Universität München in 1830 which he completed with honors in 1832. He was now licensed as a practicing pharmacist. In 1833, Spitzweg gave up his career as a pharmacist. During a spa stay in Bad Sulz, Peißenberg, after an illness, he decided to devote himself to painting in a full-time level. The decision was made easier by the fact that he received the share of his inheritance at this time.

Spitzweg was self-taught as an artist, starting by copying the works of Flemish masters. He contributed with his first work to satiric magazines. In 1835, he became a member of the Munich Art Association. This was followed by trips to Dalmatia (1839), Venice (1850), and, in the company of the landscape painter Eduard Schleich, to Paris, London, where they visited the first world exhibition, in 1851. On the way back home, he also visited Antwerp (1851), Frankfurt am Main and Heidelberg.

Spitzweg spent his travels to these European cities studying the works of various artists and refining his technique and style. His later paintings and drawings are often humorous genre works. Many of his paintings depict sharply characterized eccentrics, for example The Bookworm (1850) and The Hypochondriac (c. 1865, in the Neue Pinakothek, Munich).

Since 1844 he was an employee of the weekly magazine Fliegenden Blätter, where he published numerous humorous drawings.

Spitzweg died of a stroke, shortly after the death of his younger brother, on September 23, 1885, at the age of 77. He was found dead in his Munich apartment. He was buried in the Alter Südfriedhof, in Munich.

== Artwork ==
Spitzweg created over 1,500 pictures and drawings. Since 1824, he began painting with oil paints. During his lifetime, he was able to sell around four hundred paintings. He found admirers and buyers primarily among the citizens who had gained new purchasing power.

His painting style belongs to the late romantic period. Initially Spitzweg was associated with the Biedermeier style, but later his style of painting became more relaxed and closer to impressionism. Spitzweg drew a lot in his youth. Even while working in the pharmacy, he drew the heads of real and imaginary sick people, young and old, as well as the people from the small town of Straubing. What Spitzweg particularly appreciated about this idyllic town was the picturesque small townscape with the narrow streets and graceful bay windows, the turrets, fountains and stone figures. These motifs will often appear in his paintings.

Spitzweg depicted people in their contemporary bourgeois milieu. In his small format paintings, he depicts the Biedermeier petty bourgeoisie, the oddball eccentrics and romantic events. He did represent human weaknesses, but not the wicked or the mean: anything coarse was alien to Spitzweg. The Poor Poet, Spitzweg's best-known and most popular work, dates from 1839. In The Cactus Lover, Spitzweg shows the office worker in front of his favorite plant. Paintings such as At the Antiquary, Sentinel at the Gate, The Alchemist, The Bookworm, among others, are also representative of his style.

Through his friendship with the landscape painter Eduard Schleich, with whom he traveled many times, he became more aware of the landscape. With a sense of nature and color, he painted grandiose mountain massifs and their open expanses, romantic forest corners, the green plateaus with forests, meadows and harvest fields, mostly in good weather, because he preferred to depict the light.

Spitzweg had a keen sense of color. Through his pharmacist training, he gained chemical and technical experience in the production of his paints. He used a unique, bright shade of blue that cannot be found in any other painter. He also knew how to produce lasting colors. From his long travels, Spitzweg brought home a rich collection of sketches, which he used to create his paintings in the studio.

== Forgeries ==
In the late 1930s an art forgery case in Germany involved 54 paintings which had been passed off as Spitzweg originals. They had been painted by a Traunstein copyist named Toni, who worked from reproductions and picture postcards. Toni signed the works "in the style of Spitzweg" with his own name, but fraudsters later removed his name and artificially aged the paintings in order to sell them as originals. At the Stuttgart Criminal Court Assizes, the conspirators were jailed for up to ten years for the swindle.

== Looted works ==
Adolf Hitler was a fan of Spitzweg's work; he claimed to have acquired the world's finest collection of Spitzwegs.

Playing Piano, an etching by Spitzweg, was found as part of the Munich Art Hoard.

== Cultural references ==
Spitzweg's paintings inspired the musical comedy Das kleine Hofkonzert (1933) by Edmund Nick, which itself was later adapted into several films.

== Selected paintings ==
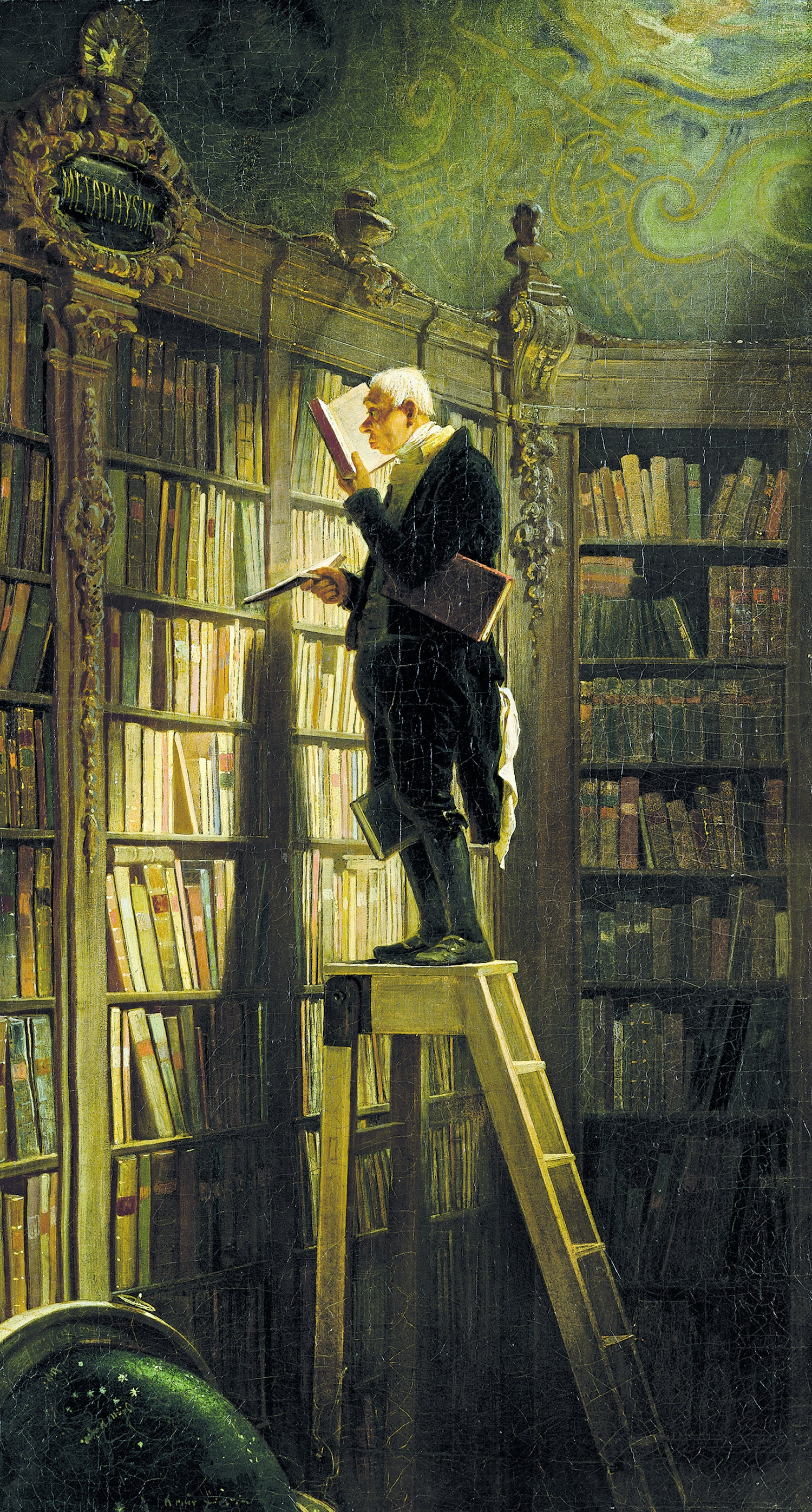
The Bookworm, original 1850, Museum Georg Schäfer. Two other versions exist.

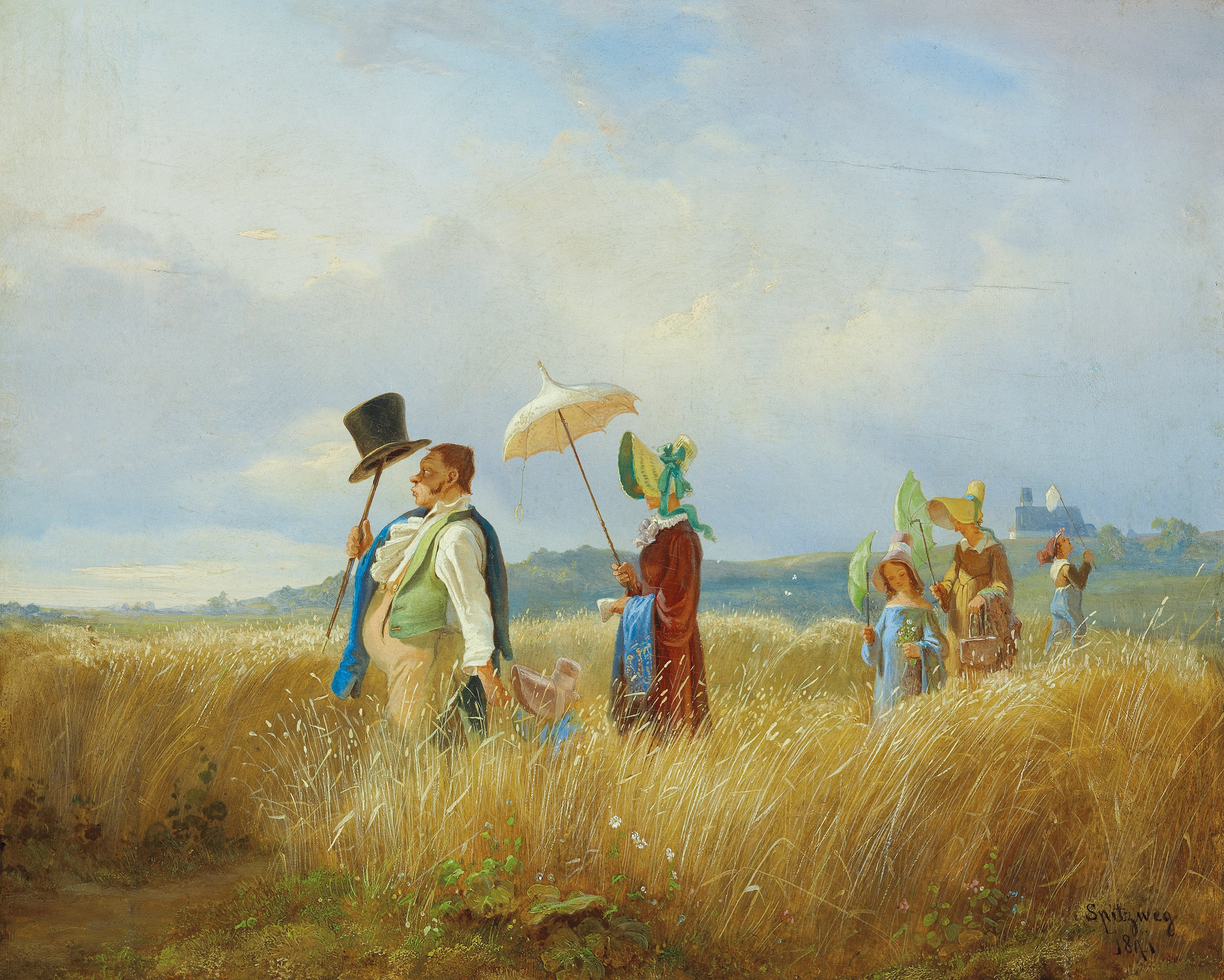
The Sunday Walk, 1841

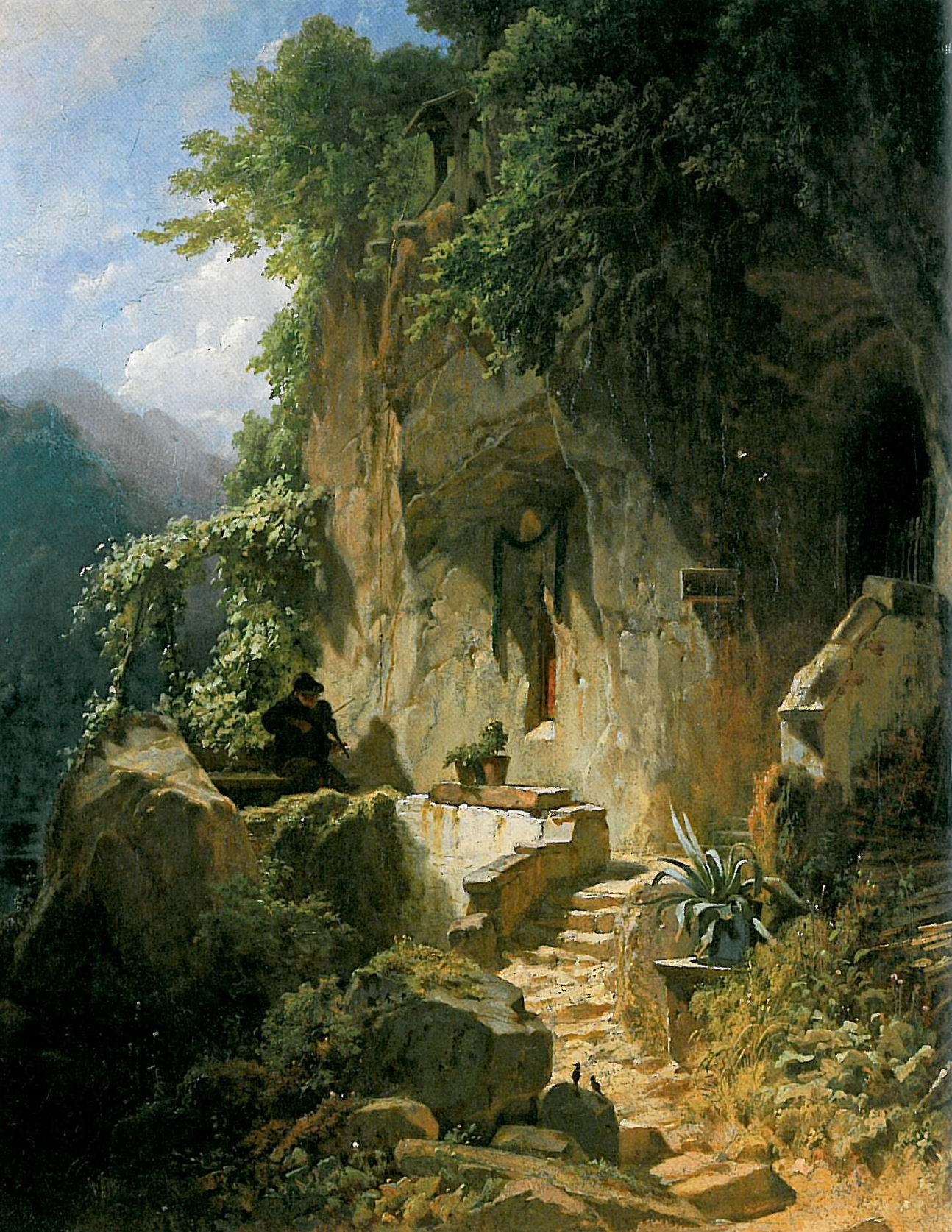
Music-making Hermit before his Rocky Abode, c. 1856–1858

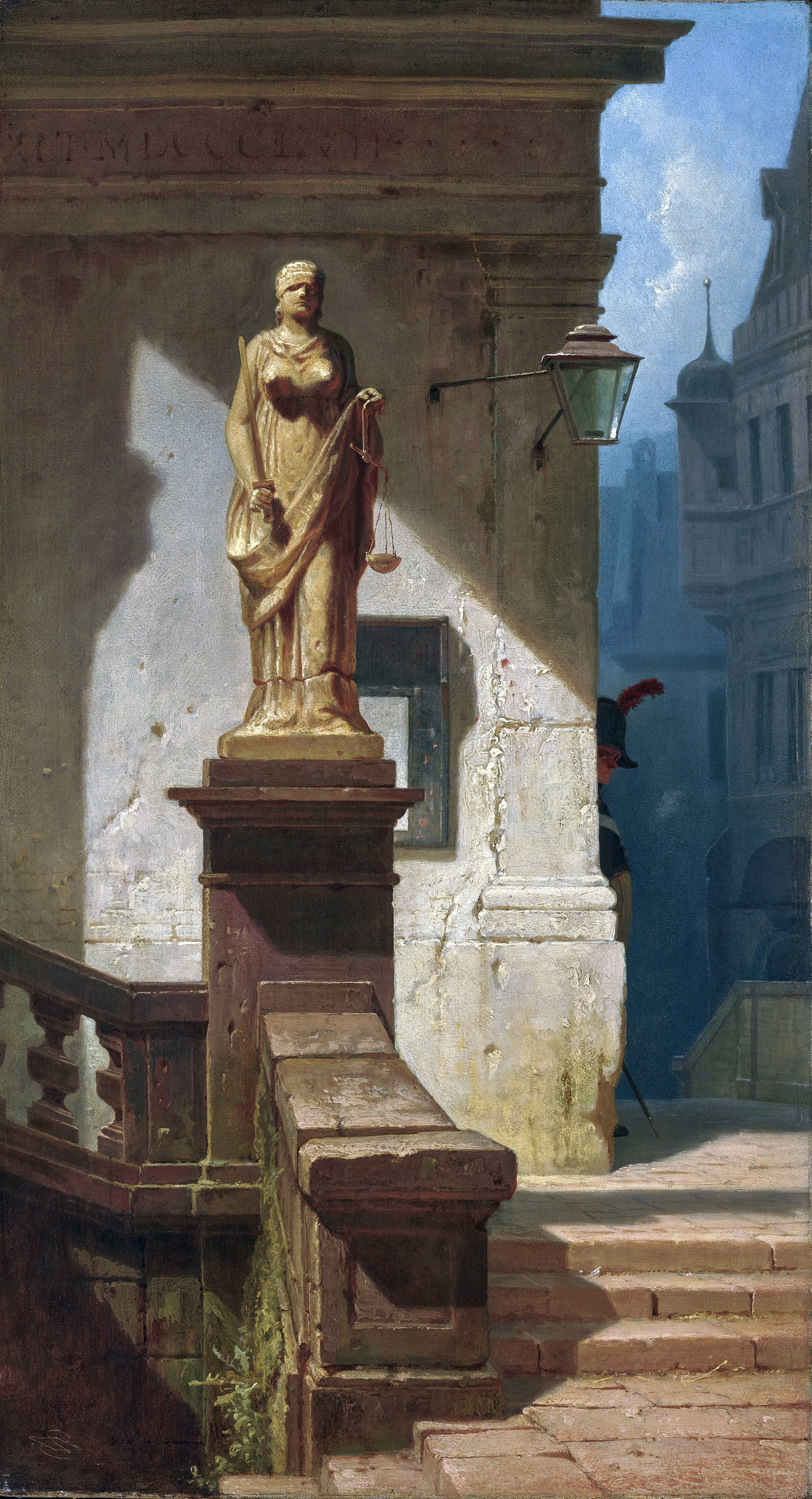
Justitia, c. 1857

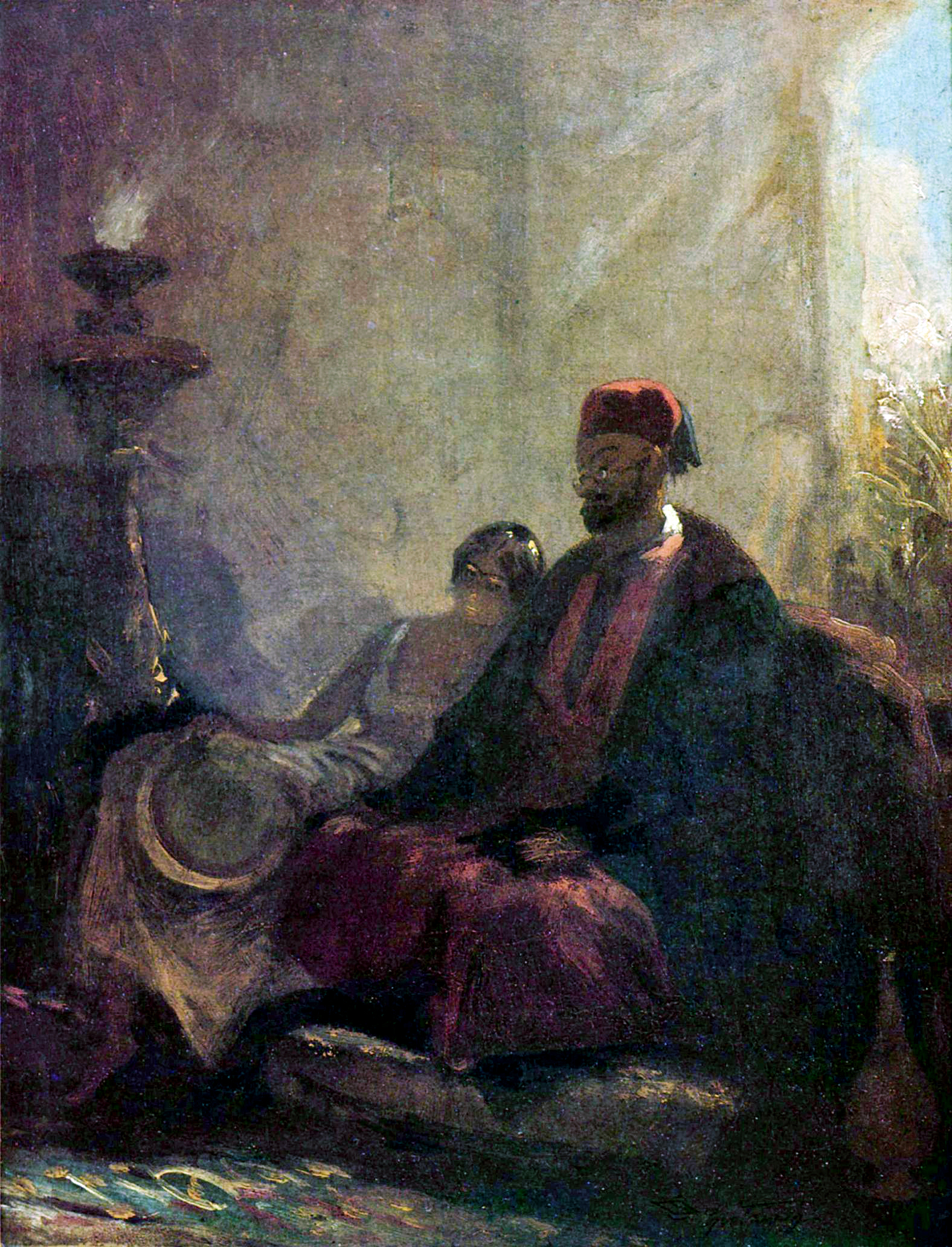
In the Harem, after 1855, Museum Georg Schäfer

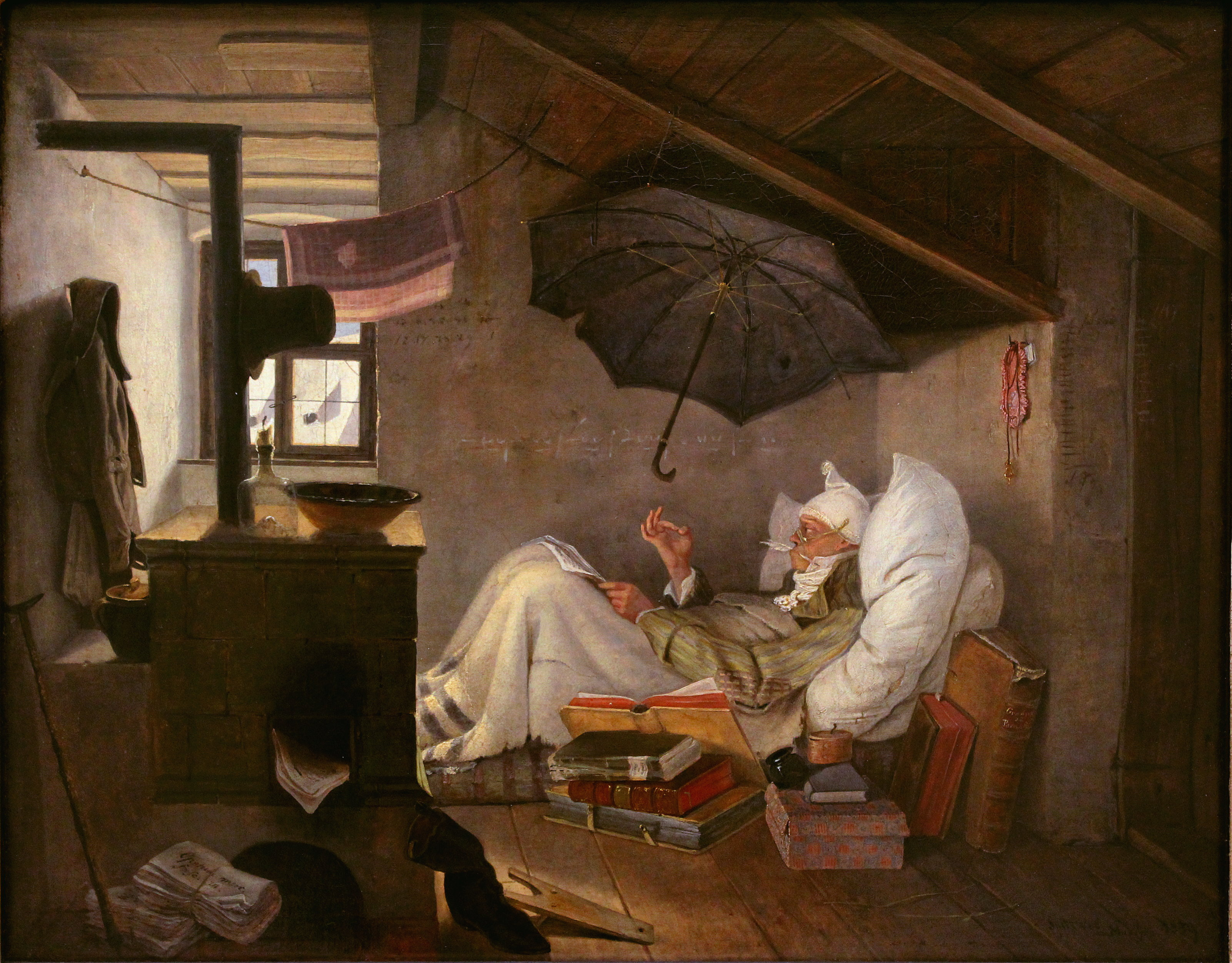
The Poor Poet, 1839, Neue Pinakothek

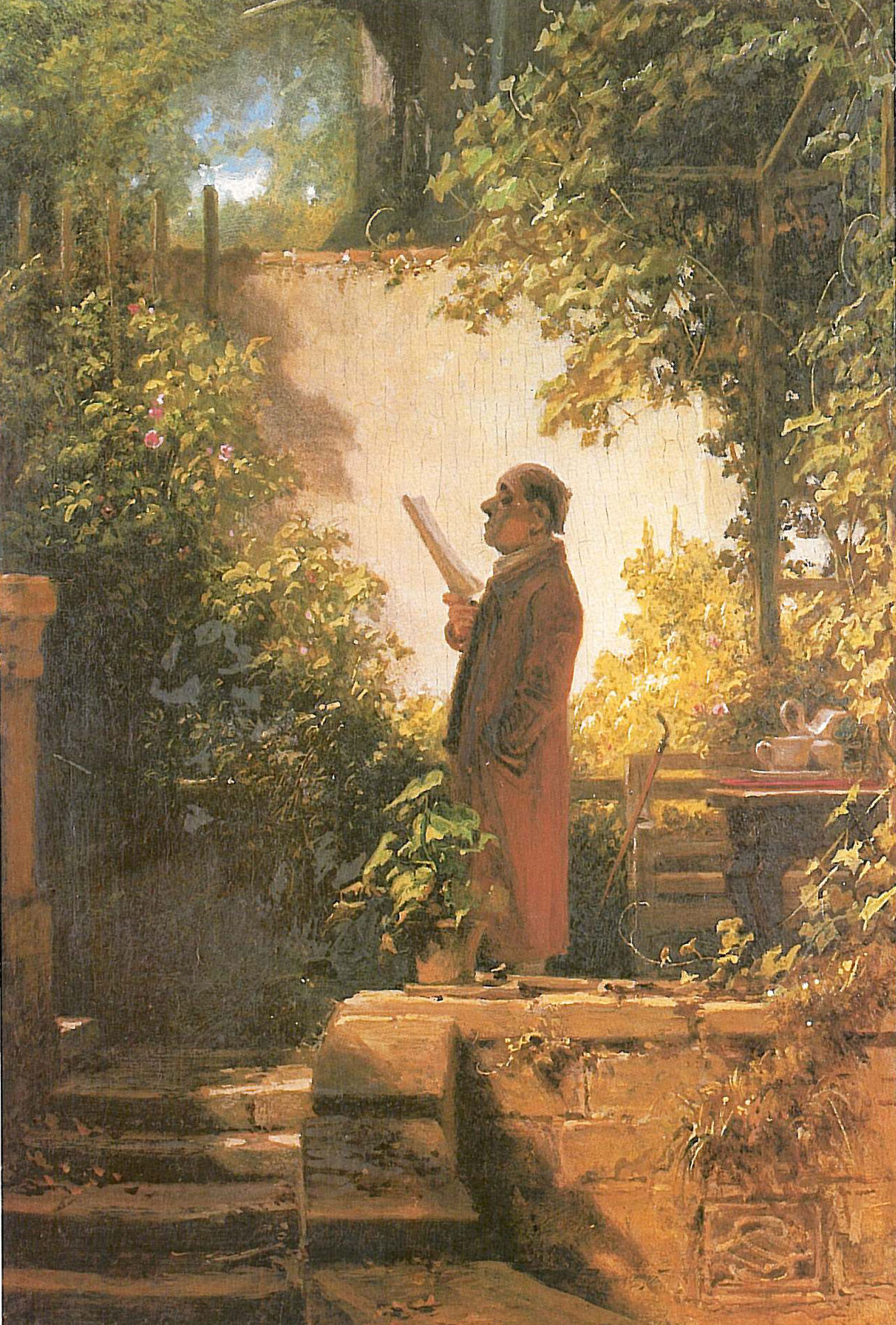
Newspaper reader in his backyard, c. 1845–1858

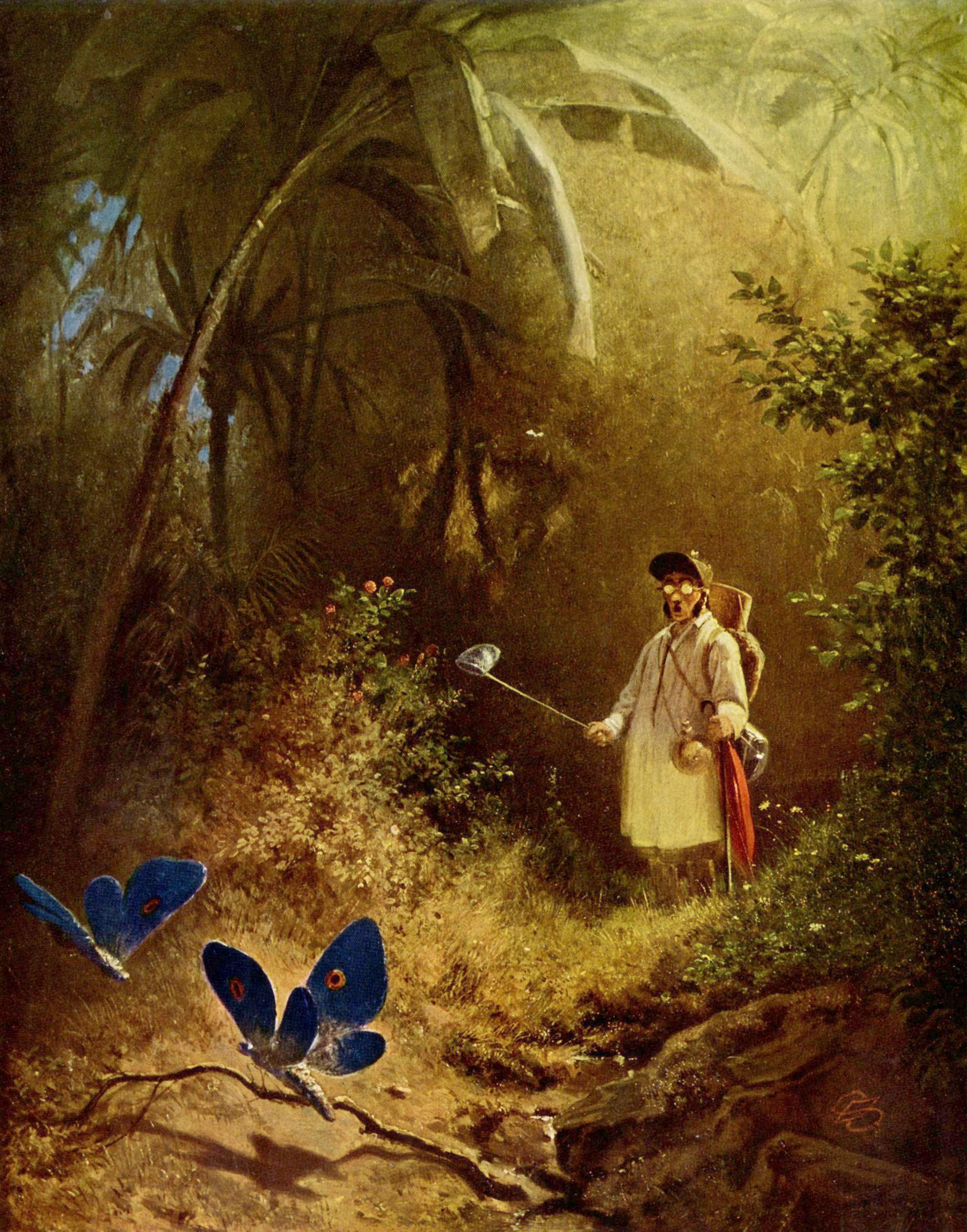
The butterfly hunter, 1840, a depiction from the era of butterfly collection

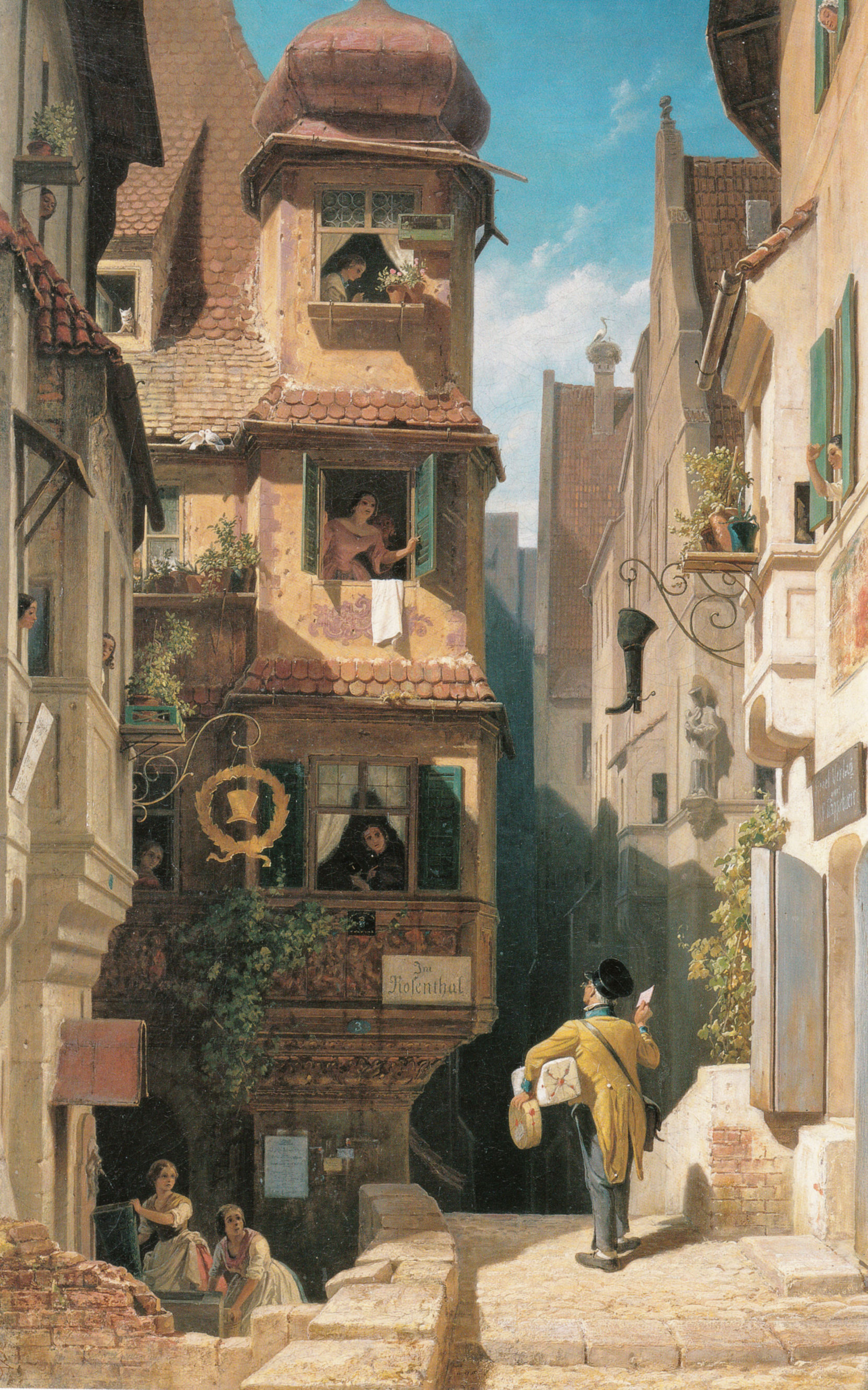
The Letter Carrier in the Rose Valley, c. 1858–18

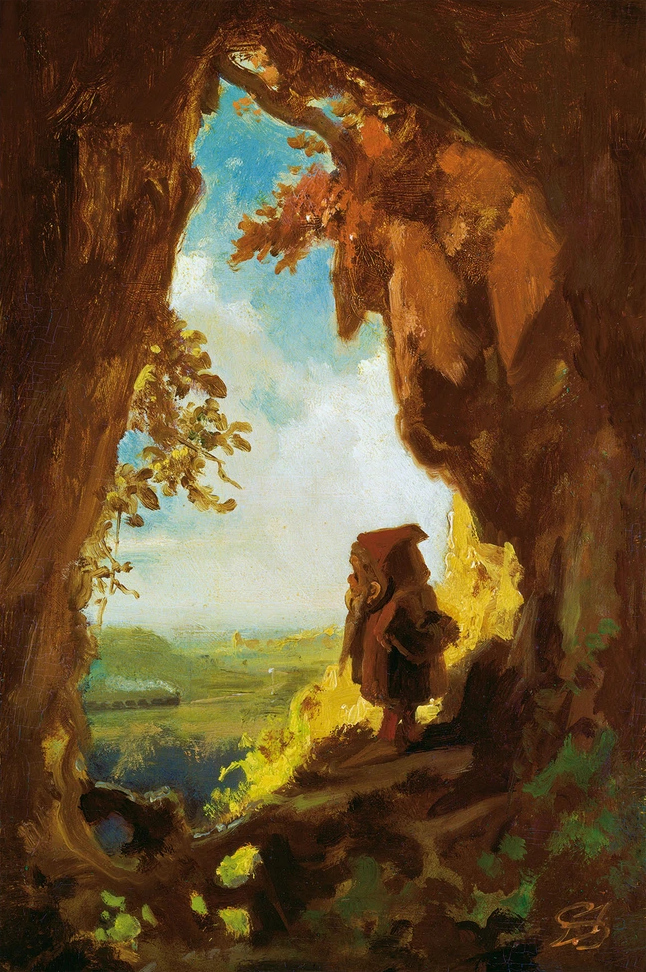
Gnome Watching Railway Train, c. 1848

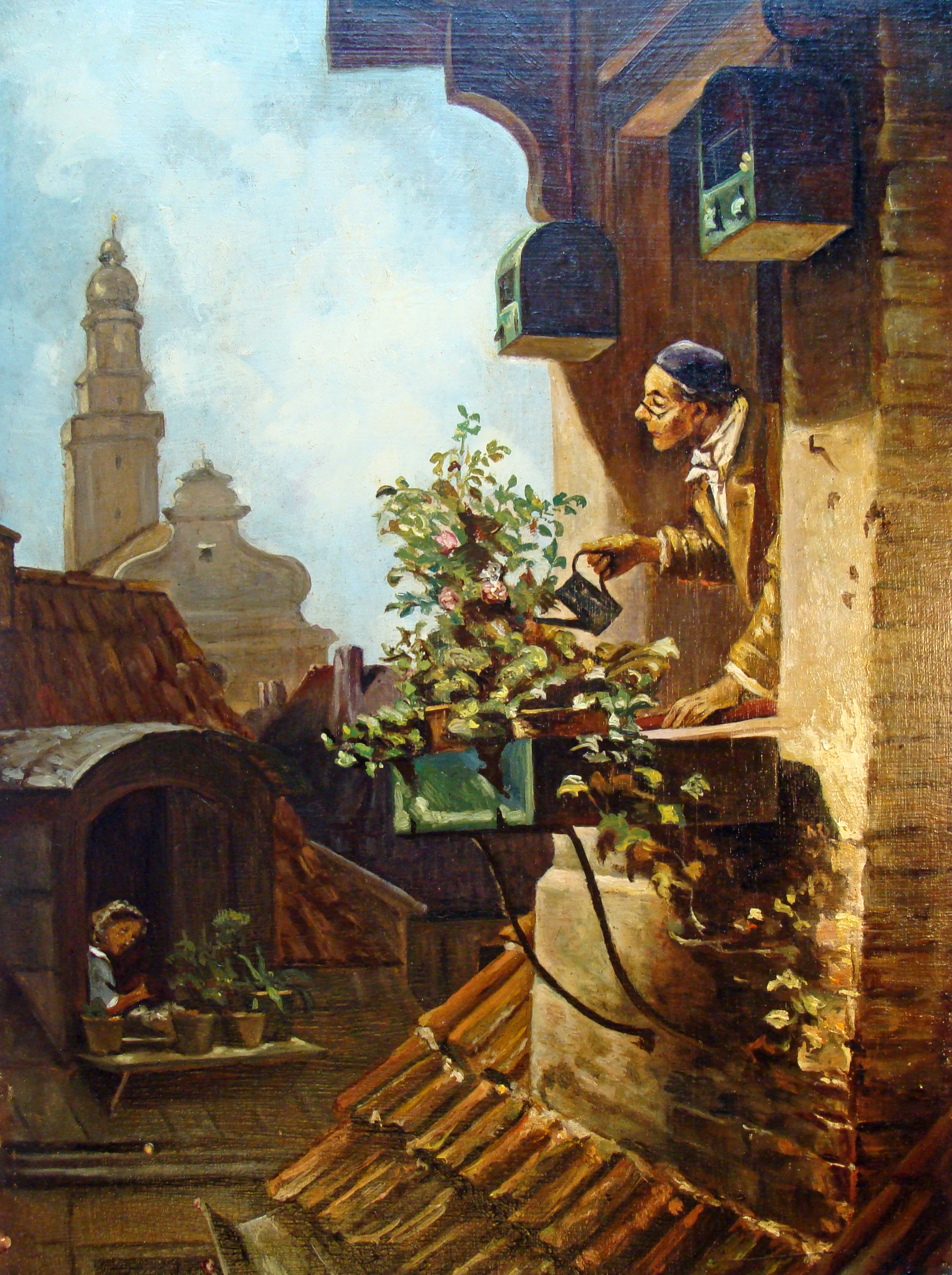
The Attic, c. 1840s

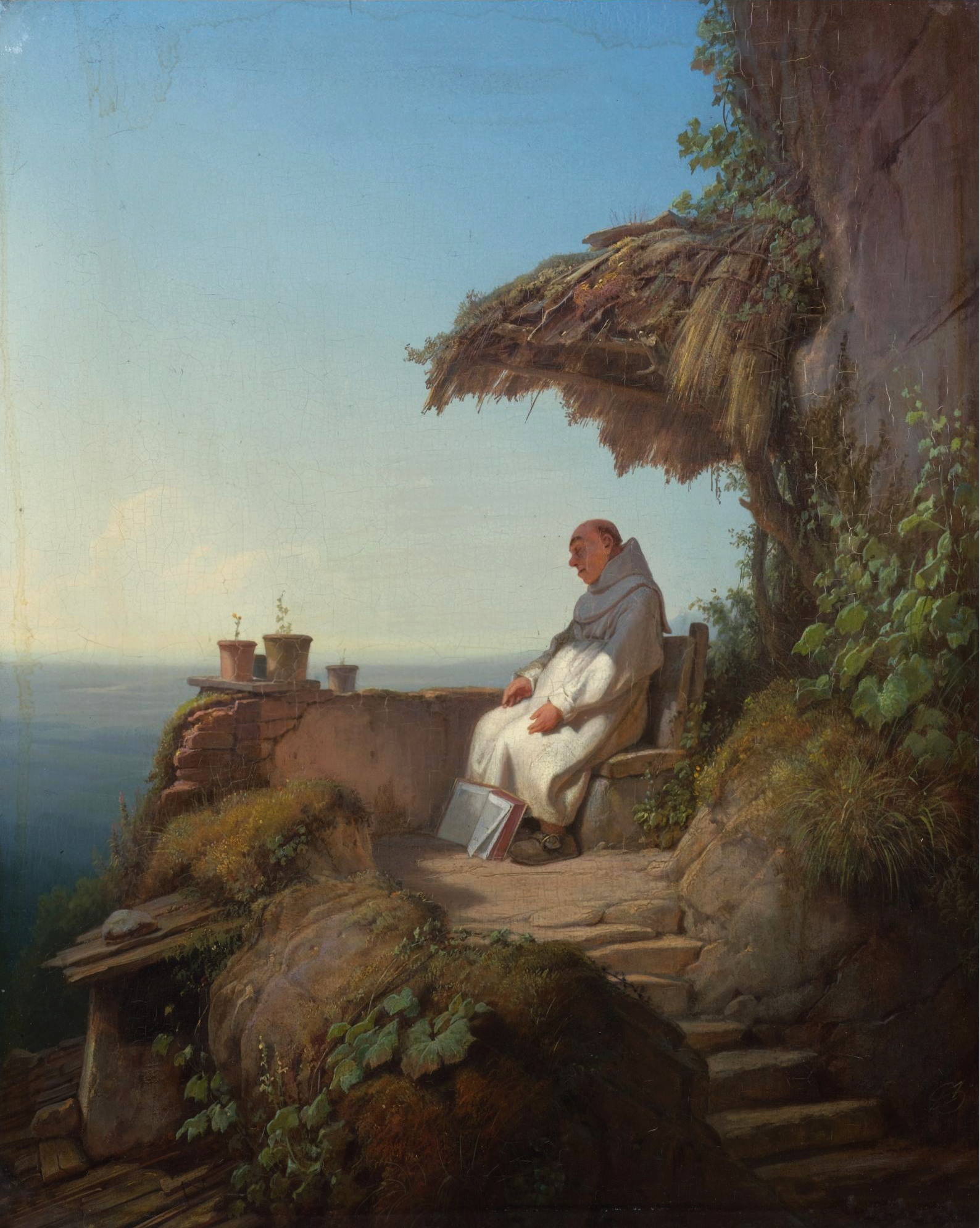
The Hermit Asleep

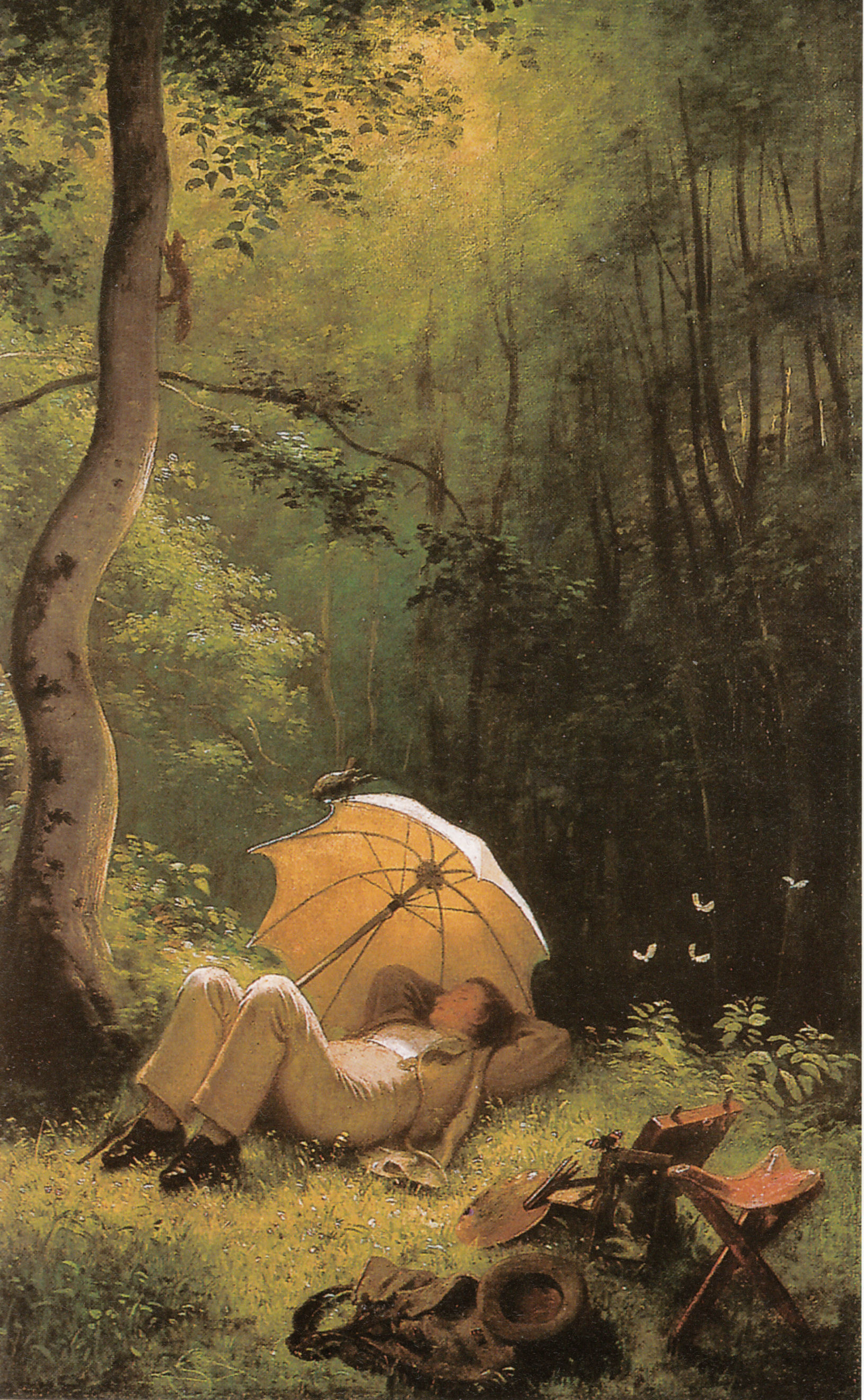
The Painter in a Forest Clearing, Lying under an Umbrella, c. 1850

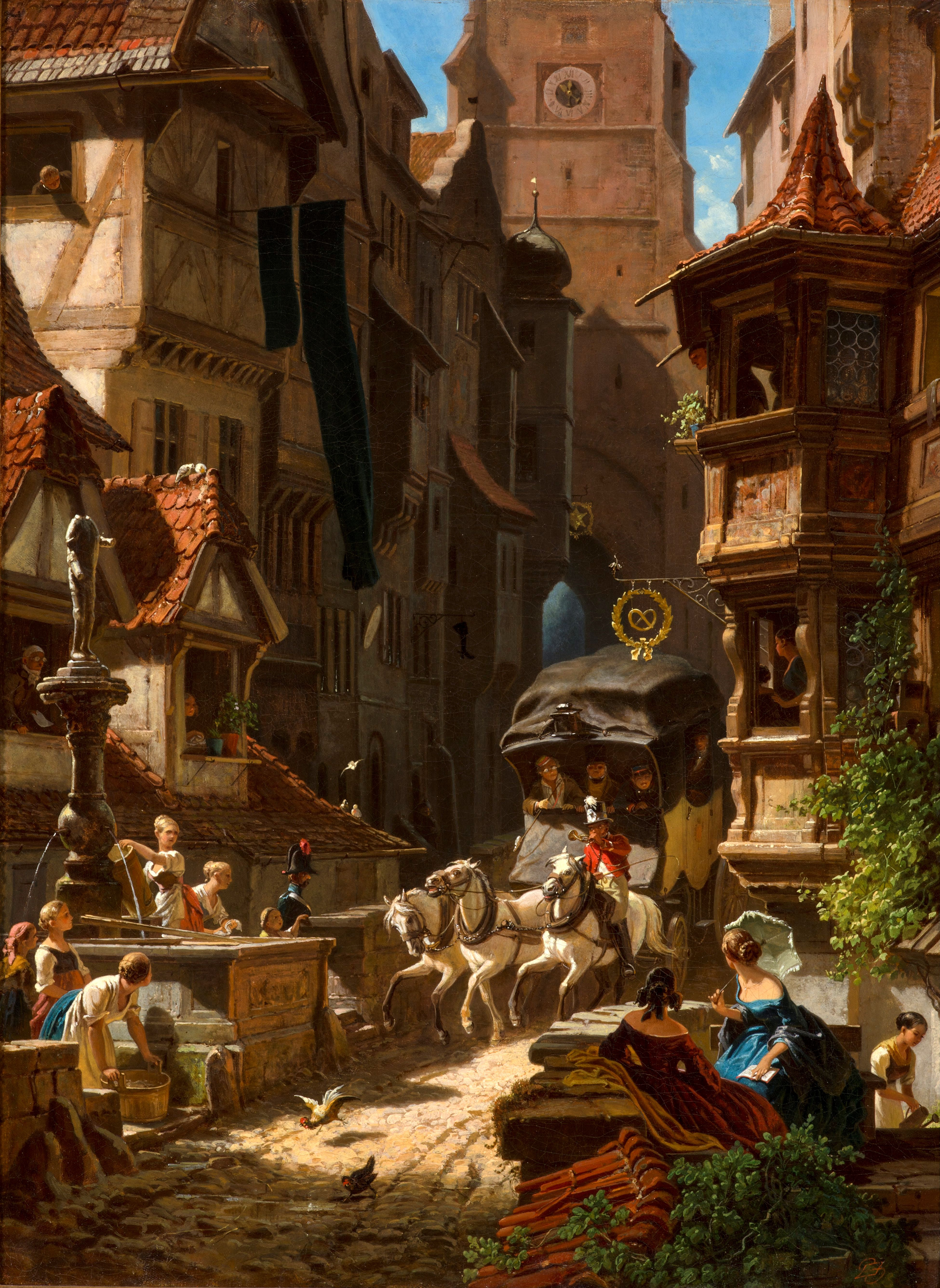
Arrival of the Stagecoach, c. 1859

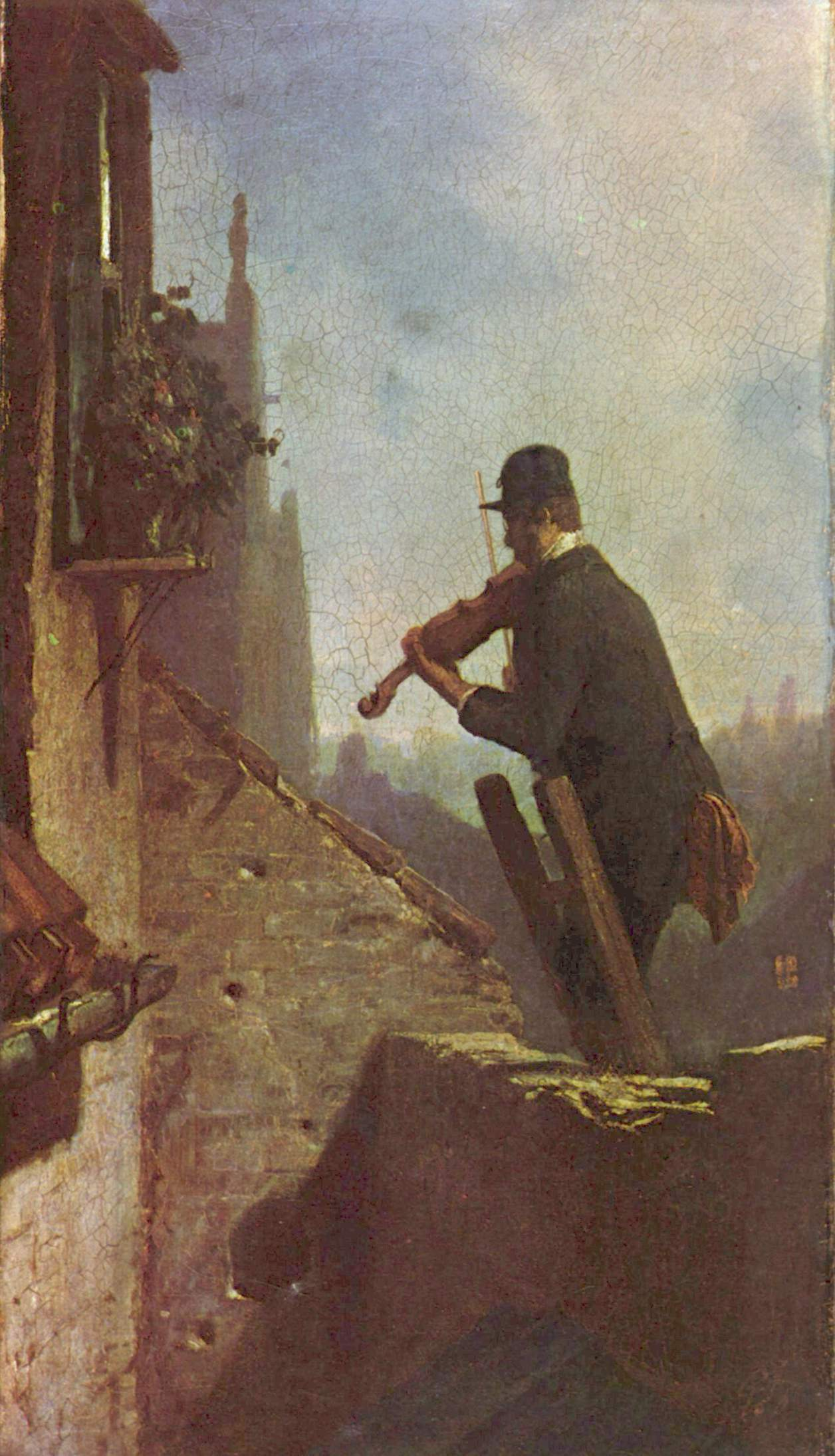
The Serenade, 1854

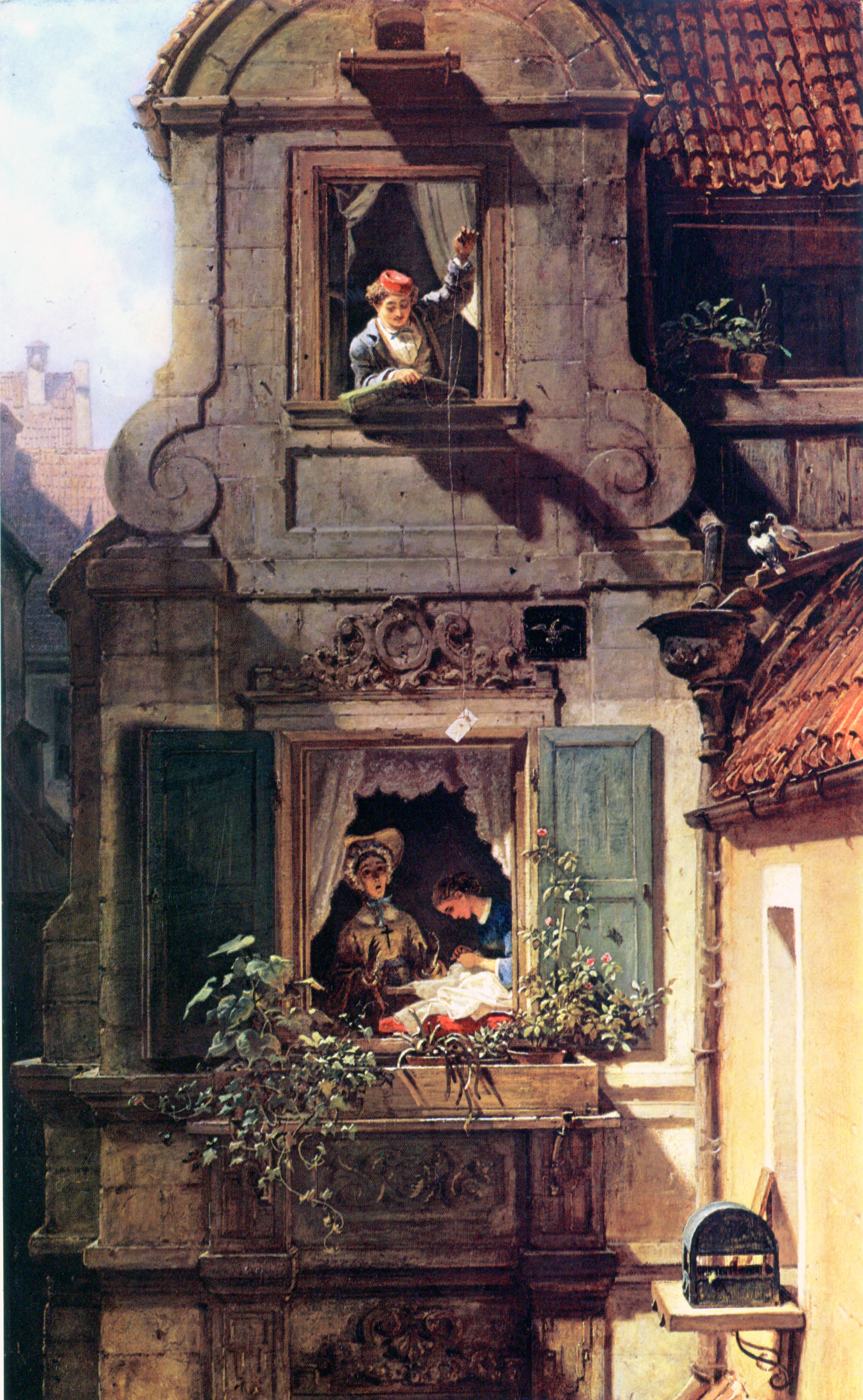
The Intercepted Love Letter, c. 1860

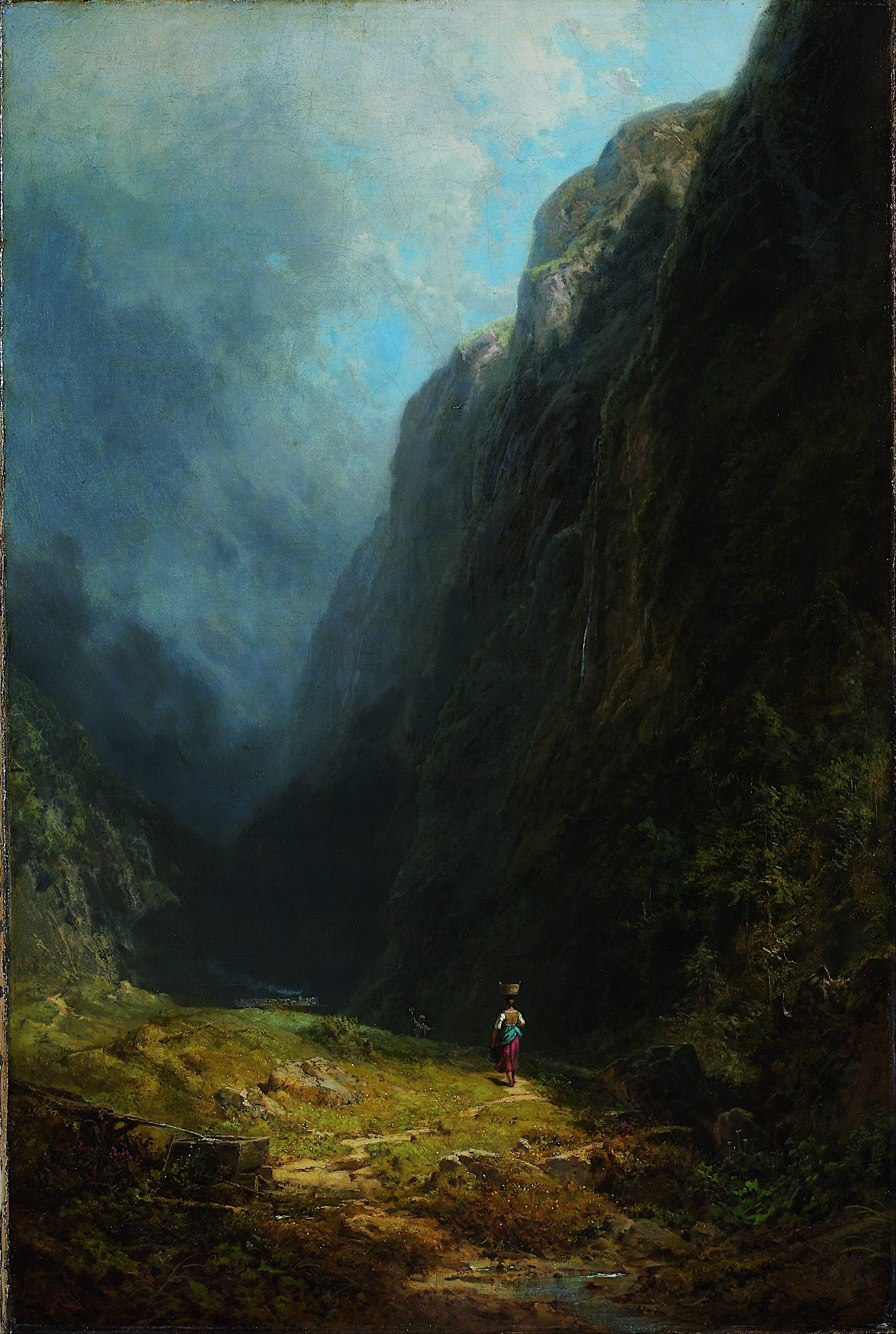
In the Alpine High Valley (Landscape with Mt. Wendelstein), c. 1871

== Sources ==
- Murray, P. & L. (1996). Dictionary of Art and Artists. London: Penguin Books. ISBN 0-14-051300-0.
