= Sulamith and Mary =

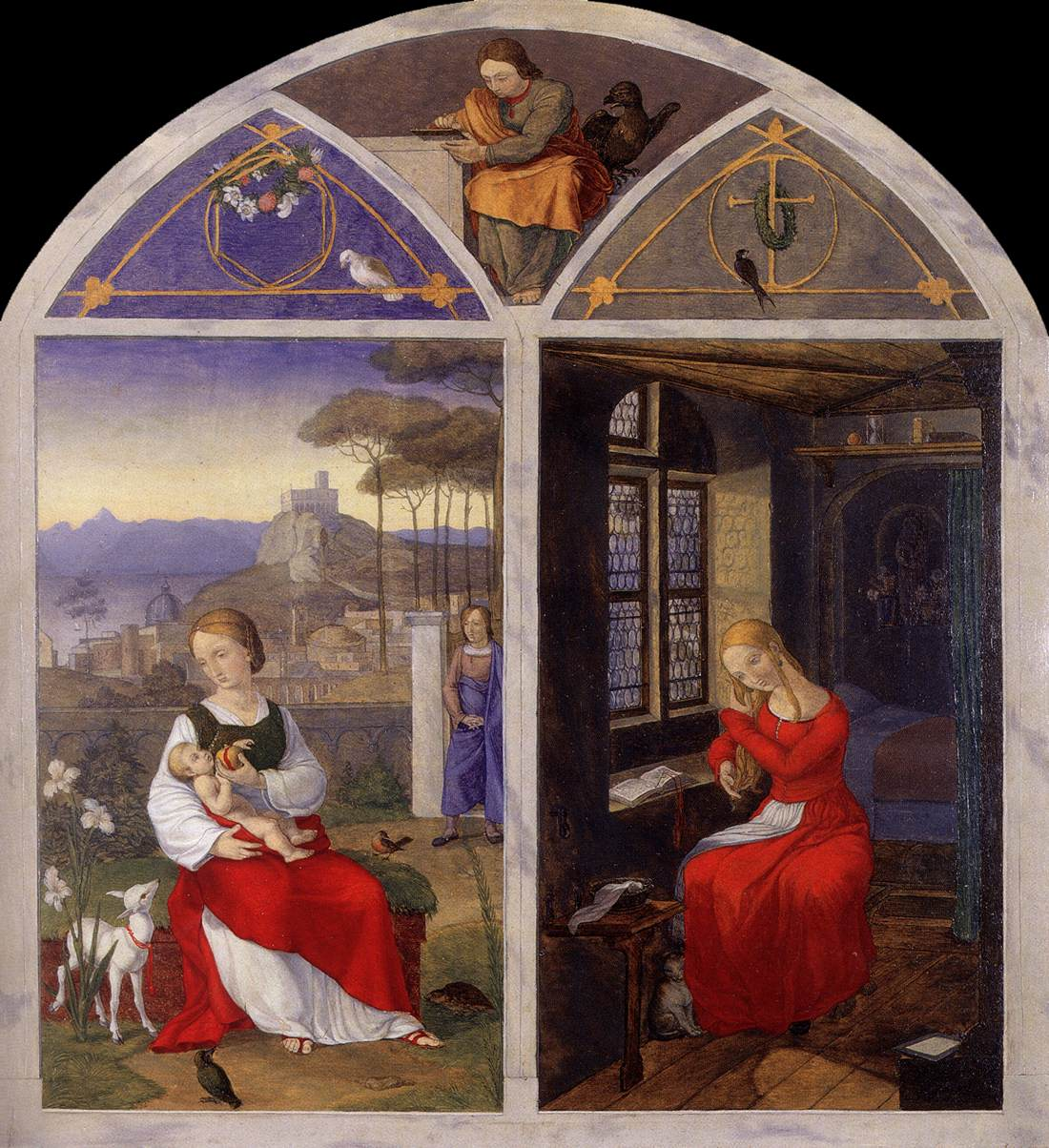
- Artist: Franz Pforr
- Year: 1810–1811
- Type: Oil on wood
- Location: Museum Georg Schäfer, Schweinfurt

Sulamith and Mary is a panel painting by the German artist Franz Pforr, created in 1810–1811, small in size, measuring 34 × 32 centimeters. Sulamith is depicted against the backdrop of an Italian landscape, while Mary is situated in an old German room. Pforr made the work as a friendship portrait for his friend Friedrich Overbeck, who painted a counterpart titled Italia and Germania. Sulamith and Mary is housed in the Museum Georg Schäfer in Schweinfurt. Italia and Germania is in the Neue Pinakothek in Munich.

== Context ==
Starting in 1806, Franz Pforr attended the Academy of Fine Arts in Vienna, where he became friends with Friedrich Overbeck. Together with a few others, they founded the anti-academic Lukasbund there, laying the groundwork for the later movement of the Nazarenes. They reverted to medieval painting principles and pursued art on a religious basis. In 1810, Pforr traveled to Italy with Overbeck and some other members of the group to seek inspiration. The initiative for the trip came from Overbeck, with Pforr intending to return to his hometown after a maximum of two years. In Rome, the artists took up residence in the old Franciscan monastery San Isidoro on the Pincio hill. Later, they traveled to Nemi, Naples, and finally Albano, where Pforr died of tuberculosis in 1812.

== Theme ==
In 1810, Pforr and Overbeck agreed to create a friendship painting for each other, using two female figures to express the ideal of true beauty. They chose Sulamith, a woman from the Song of Songs, and Mary. Pforr not only painted a picture but also wrote a story, indicating that both figures are twin sisters who were separated early in life. They have different outlooks on life, with Sulamith being worldly and open, with a great longing for the south (like Overbeck), and Mary being more modest and innocent, almost bourgeois German (as Pforr saw himself). However, they share the same roots and are thus deeply connected, just as Pforr and Overbeck were in their friendship.

The theme can also refer to Pforr's secret desire to return home soon after their departure to Italy. His early death prevented this from happening. Overbeck would remain in Rome for most of his life, becoming the leading exponent of the Nazarenes, while Pforr left only a handful of works.

== Image ==
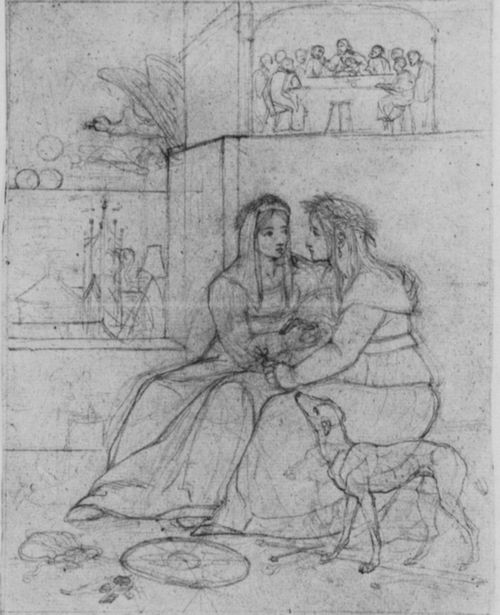
Allegory of Friendship, 1808, a study by Pforr with the same theme.

Pforr painted Sulamith and Mary on a small panel in the form of a medieval triptych, based on several preliminary studies. By reverting to this setup, he expressed his admiration for the art perception of that period, in which, as he once wrote to Overbeck, "the dignity of man was still fully visible". This concept would, after his death, become the creed of the Nazarenes. This is evident in the attention to bright color contrasts and the disregard for perspective rules, focusing attention entirely on the figures.

=== Sulamith ===
Associated with Overbeck, Sulamith is depicted on the left panel against the backdrop of a southern Italian landscape. The scene is expansive and open. In the background stands a male figure, representing the husband. Both figures refer to the passage in the Song of Songs where Christ is presented as the bridegroom. The bridegroom symbolism repeatedly appears in the correspondence between Pforr and Overbeck as a sign of their mutual bond and their commitment to art. The birds and flowers symbolize fertility and abundance, as referenced in the Song of Songs. The roe deer and a red collar also appear in the Song of Songs as bridegroom symbols. The child in Sulamith's arms can be interpreted as the fruit of Overbeck's bond with art, being fed a pomegranate symbolizing inner beauty. The dove in the upper panel signifies peaceful friendship, mentioned in the Song of Songs as a turtledove.

=== Mary ===
In the right panel, Pforr refers to himself with Mary. Depicted in an enclosed old German room, with a book in front of her, she turns inward. In a letter to Overbeck, he mentions that the details should contribute to an atmosphere of "quiet domesticity". It is orderly, the bed is neatly made, and daylight shines gently in. The cat, the crown glass window, and the swallow in the upper panel (near the cross) should be understood in this context. The whole exudes a kind of pious decorum, presented as a moral ideal.

=== Upper Panel ===
In the upper central panel, the evangelist John is depicted, writing at a table. To his right sits an eagle. The eagle is not only a symbol for the evangelist John but also refers to the artistic ambition that connects Pforr and Overbeck. John is Overbeck's favorite evangelist, his second baptismal name, and also the name with which Pforr often addressed Overbeck. It underscores the many personal elements in the painting's symbolism, not all of which can be traced back to the correspondence between the two artists.

== Italy and Germany ==
Italia and Germania
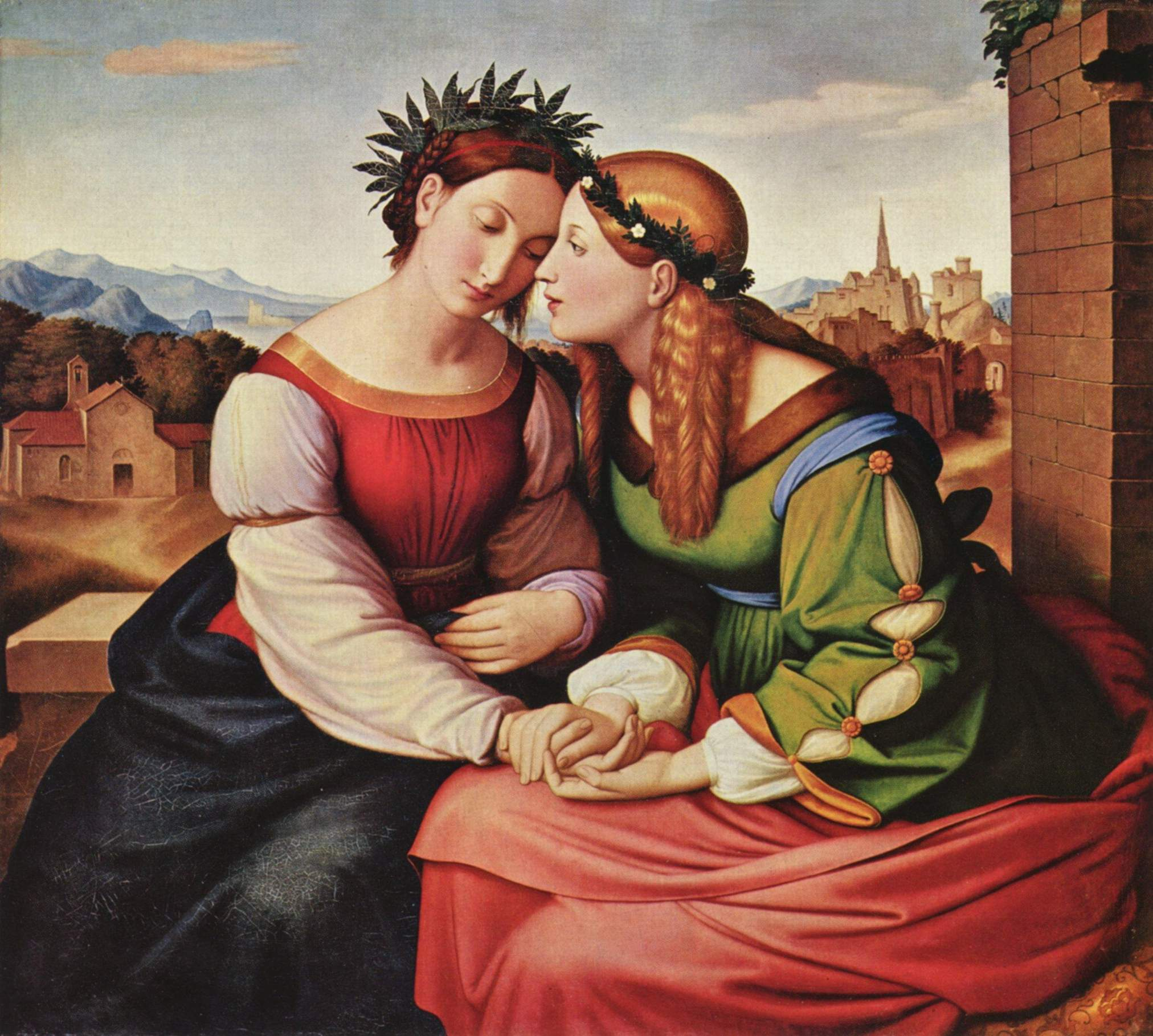
- Artist: Friedrich Overbeck
- Year: 1811–1828
- Type: Oil on canvas
- Location: Neue Pinakothek, Munich

Around the same time that Pforr was working on Sulamith and Mary, Overbeck began his counterpart with the same theme. On the left, he painted Sulamith against the backdrop of an Italian landscape, and on the right, Mary with a typical German town with narrow streets behind her. After Pforr's death in 1812, Overbeck left the work unfinished for a long time. Sixteen years later, he resumed it, giving it a new twist and the title Italia and Germania. This painting emphasizes the strong bond between Germany and Italy more than his friendship with Pforr. Sulamith is depicted on the left as a dark-haired Italian with a laurel wreath on her head, corresponding to the beauty ideal of that time. Mary embodies the northern type and has a myrtle wreath in her hair. The two women turn to each other with an expression of intimate trust and possess an inner monumentality that is almost absent in Pforr's work.
