= List of works by Georg Baselitz =

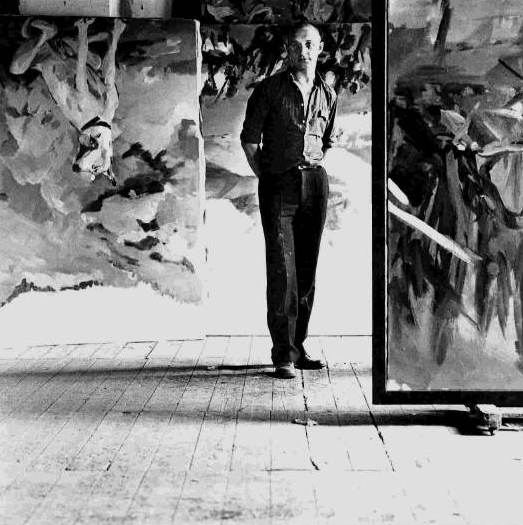
Georg Baselitz photographed by Lothar Wolleh, Mülheim, 1971

This is an incomplete list of works by the German painter, Georg Baselitz.

== Works ==
Original title	English title	Date
Ohne Titel	Untitled	1958
Der Orientale – Kranker Orientale – Vision – Glaubensträger	The Oriental – Sick Oriental – Vision – Upholder of the Faith	1959
Paranoia	Paranoia	1960
Russische Frauenliebe	Russian Women's Love	1960
Rayski Kopf	Rayski Head series	1960–61
G.-Kopf	G.-Head	1960–61
Auf einer Landschaft	On a Landscape	1961
Der Acker	The Field	1962
Drei Köpfe	Three Heads	1962
Brustkorb	Ribcage	1962
Hommage à Charles Méryon	Homage to Charles Méryon	1962–63
Die große Nacht im Eimer	The Big Night Down the Drain	1962–63
Tränenbeutel	Tear Sac	1963
Schweinekopf	Pig's Head	1963
Aus Der Traum	The Dream is Over	1963
Drei Herzen	Three Hearts	1963
Hommage à Wrubel	Homage to Vrubel	1963
1 P.D. – Der Fuß	1st P.D. – The Foot	1963
2. P.D. Fuß – Alte Heimat	2nd P.D. Foot – Old Native Country	1960–63
Dritter P.D. Fuß	Third P.D. Foot	1963
Vierter P.D. Fuß – Alte Heimat (Scheide der Existenz)	Fourth P.D. Foot – Old Native Country (Border of Existence)	1960/63
Fünfter P.D. Fuß – Russischer Fuß	Fifth P.D. Foot – Russian Foot	1963
6. P.D. Fuß	6th P.D. Foot	1963
P.D. Fuß – Kelte	P.D. Foot – Celt	1963
Achtes P.D. – Die Hand	Eighth P.D. – The Hand	1963
P.D.	P.D.	1960/63
P.D. Fuß	P.D. Foot	1963
Gruß aus der Zukunft	Greetings from the Future	1963
Geschlecht mit Klössen	Sex With Dumplings	1963
Idol	Idol	1963
P.D. Idol	P.D. Idol	1964
Oberon – 1. Orthodoxer Salon 64 – E. Neijsvestnij	Oberon – 1st Orthodox Salon 64 – E Neizvestny	1963/64
Weihnachten	Christmas	1964
Die poetische Kugel	The Poetic Sphere	1964
Das Herz	The Heart	1964
Das Kreuz	The Cross	1964
Gottes Horn – Ich bin unumgänglich	God's Horn – I Am Indispensable	1964
Die Peitschenfrau	The Whip Woman	1965
Bild für die Väter	Picture for the Fathers	1965
Die Banane	The Banana	1965
Mann im Mond – Franz Pforr	Man in the Moon – Franz Pforr	1965
Das Blumenmädchen	The Flower Girl	1965
Der Dichter	The Poet	1965
Die Hand – Das brennende Haus	The Hand – The Burning House	1964/65
Die Hand – Die Hand Gottes	The Hand – The Hand of God	1964/65
Rotgrüner – Die rote Fahne – Der Rot-Grüne	Red-Green Man – The Red Flag – The Red-Green Man	1965
Der Hirte	The Shepherd	1965
Ökonomie	Economy	1965
Ralf 1	Ralf 1	1965
Der Hirte	The Shepherd [2]	1965
Die großen Freunde	The Great Friends	1965
Rebell	Rebel	1965
Der Hirte	The Shepherd [4]	1965
Das große Pathos	The Great Pathos	1965
Ludwig Richter auf dem Weg zur Arbeit	Ludwig Richter on his way to work	1965
Ein Vesperrter	A Blocked One	1965
Der Baum 1	The Tree 1	1965/66
Falle	Trap	1966
Das Hirte	The Shepherd	1966
Schwarzgründig	Black Grounded	1966
Exote	Exotic	1966
Schwarz Weiß	Black White	1966
Lockiger	Curly One	1966
Zwei geteilte Kühe II	Two Divided Cows II	1966
Drei Streifen – Der Maler im Mantel – Zweites Frakturbild	Three Strips – The Painter in a Coat – Second Fracture Painting	1966
M.M.M. in G und A	M.M.M. in G und A	1961/62/66
Großer Kopf	Large Head	1966
Der Jäger	The Hunter	1966
Drei Köpfe mit Schnecke	Heads Heads with Slug	1966
Kullervos Füße	Kullervo's Feet	1967
Mann mit Gitarre. Paranoiamarsch	Man with Guitar. Paranoia March	1967
Katzenkopf	Cat's Head	1966/67
Kullervos Beine – Füße	Kullervo's Legs – Feet	1967
Ein Grüner	Green One	1967
B für Larry	B for Larry	1967
Hunde im Gebüsch	Dogs in the Bushes	1967/68
Ein Jäger	A Hunter	1968
Waldarbeiter	Woodmen	1968
Meissener Waldarbeiter	Meissen Woodmen	1968
Die Kuh – Nr. 2	The Cow – No. 2	1969
Der Wald auf dem Kopf	The Wood on Its Head	1969
Der Mann am Baum	The Man by the Trees	1969
Da. Porträt – Franz Dahlem	Da. Portrait – Franz Dahlem	1969
D. Hildebrand – Kopfbild	D. Hildebrand – Upside-Down Picture	1969
Der werktätige Dresdener – Porträt M.G.B.	The Dresden Workman – Portrait M.G.B.	1969
Fünfziger Jahre Porträt – M.W.	Fifties Portrait – M.W.	1969
Birke	Birch	1970
Kaspar und Ilka König	Kaspar and Ilka König	1970/71
Der Falke	The Falcon	1971
Fingermalerei I – Adler – à la	Finger Painting I – Eagle – à la	1971/72
Fingermalerei Birken – 4. Bild	Finger Painting Birches – 4th Picture	1972
Elke II – Fingermalerei an Elkes Kopf	Elke II – Finger Painting on Elke's Head	1972
Fingermalarei – Interieur	Finger Painting – Interior	1973
Akt Elke	Nude Elke	1974
Birken Piskowitz	Birches Piskovitz	1974
Männlicher Akt	Male Nude	1975
Schlafzimmer	Bedroom	1975
Brauna	Brauna	1975
Elke V.	Elke V.	1976
Stilleben	Still Life	1976/77
Männlicher Akt – Schwarz	Male Nude – Black	1977
Elke 4	Elke 4	1977
Die Flasche – der Adler (3. Paar)	The Bottle – The Eagle (3rd Pair)	1978
Adler	Eagle	1978
Birnbaum Nr. 1-4 (1. Gruppe)	Pear Tree No. 1-4 (1st Group)	1978
Birnbaum Nr. 1-4 (2. Gruppe)	Pear Tree No. 1-4 (2nd Group)	1978
Die Ährenleserin	The Gleaner	1978
Trümmerfrau	Rubble Woman	1978
Adler	Eagle [2]	1978
Der Baum – Akt (13. Gruppe)	The Tree – Nude (13th Group)	1979
Das Straßenbild	The Street Picture	1979/80
Modell für eine Skulptur	Model for a Sculpture	1979/80
Ohne Titel	Untitled	1979/80
Ohne Titel	Untitled	1979/80
Frau am Strand – Night in Tunisia	Woman on Beach – Night in Tunisia	1980
Blick aus dem Fenster nach draußen – Strandbild, 7	Look Outwards of the Window – Beach Picture, 7	1981
Orangenesser I	Orange-Eater I	1981
Orangenesser IV	Orange-Eater IV	1981
Flaschentrinker	Bottle Drinking Man	1981
Glastrinker	Drinking Man	1981
Glastrinker	Glass Drinking Man	1981
Kaffeekanne und Orange	Coffeepot and Orange	1981
Buckliger Trinker	Humpbacked Drinker	1981
Adler	Eagle	1982
Frau am Strand	Woman on the Beach	1982
Die Mädchen von Olmo I	The Girls of Olmo I	1982
Mann im Bett	Man in Bed	1982
Adieu	Adieu	1982
Mann auf rotem Kopfkissen	Man on Red Pillow	1982
Nacht mit Hund	Night with Dog	1982
Adler im Bett	Eagle in Bed	1982
Franz in Bett	Franz in Bed	1982
Rotschopf	Redhead	1982
Maler mit Segelschiff	Painter with Sailing-Ship	1982
Maler mit Fäustling	Painter with Mitten	1982
Ohne Titel	Untitled[1 – 5+]	1982/83
Blauer Kopf	Blue Head	1983
Schwarz Säule	Black Post	1983
Nachtessen in Dresden	Dinner in Dresden	1983
Blauer Mann	Blue Man	1983
Der Brückechor	The Brücke Chorus	1983
Die Dornenkrönung	The Crowning with Thorns	1983
Der Bote	The Herald	1984
Lazarus	Lazarus	1984
Der rote Mann	The Red Man	1984/85
Scheibenkopf	Segment Head	1986
Die Beweinung	The Lamentation	1983
Der Abgarkopf	The Abgar Head [1–3]	1984
Die Verspottung	The Mocking	1984
Vier Hände	Four Hands	1984
Zwei Rehe	Two Deer	1985
Das Liebespaar	Loving Couple	1984
Die Nacht	The Night	1984/85
Zwei Frauen im Zimmer		1985
Mutter und Kind	Mother and Child	1985
Italienische Frau	Italian Woman	1985
Weibliche Landschaft	Female Landscape	1985
Der Hase	The Hare	1986
Pastorale – Der Tag	Pastorale – The Day	1986
Pastorale – Die Nacht	Pastorale – The Night	1985/86
Dolores	Dolores	1986
Besuch in Dresden	Visit to Dresden	1986
Zerbrochene Brücke – Wendenbraut	Shattered Bridge – Wendish Bride	1986
Zwei schwarze Bäume	Two Black Trees	1986
Gruß aus Oslo	Greetings from Oslo	1986
Adler im Keller		1987
Die Riesin	The Giantess	1987
Der Fisch	The Fish	1987
Alte Sachen	Old Things	1987
G.-Kopf	G.-Head	1987
Selbstporträt Desaster	Self-Portrait Disaster	1987
1897	1897	1986/87
Sieben mal Paula	Seven Times Paula	1987
Dicke Blonde	Fat Blonde	1987
Das Malerbild	The Painter's Picture	1988
Die Mühle brennt – Richard	The Burning Mill – Richard	1988
