= Museum Georg Schäfer =

German museum

Coordinates: 50°02′38″N 10°14′10″E

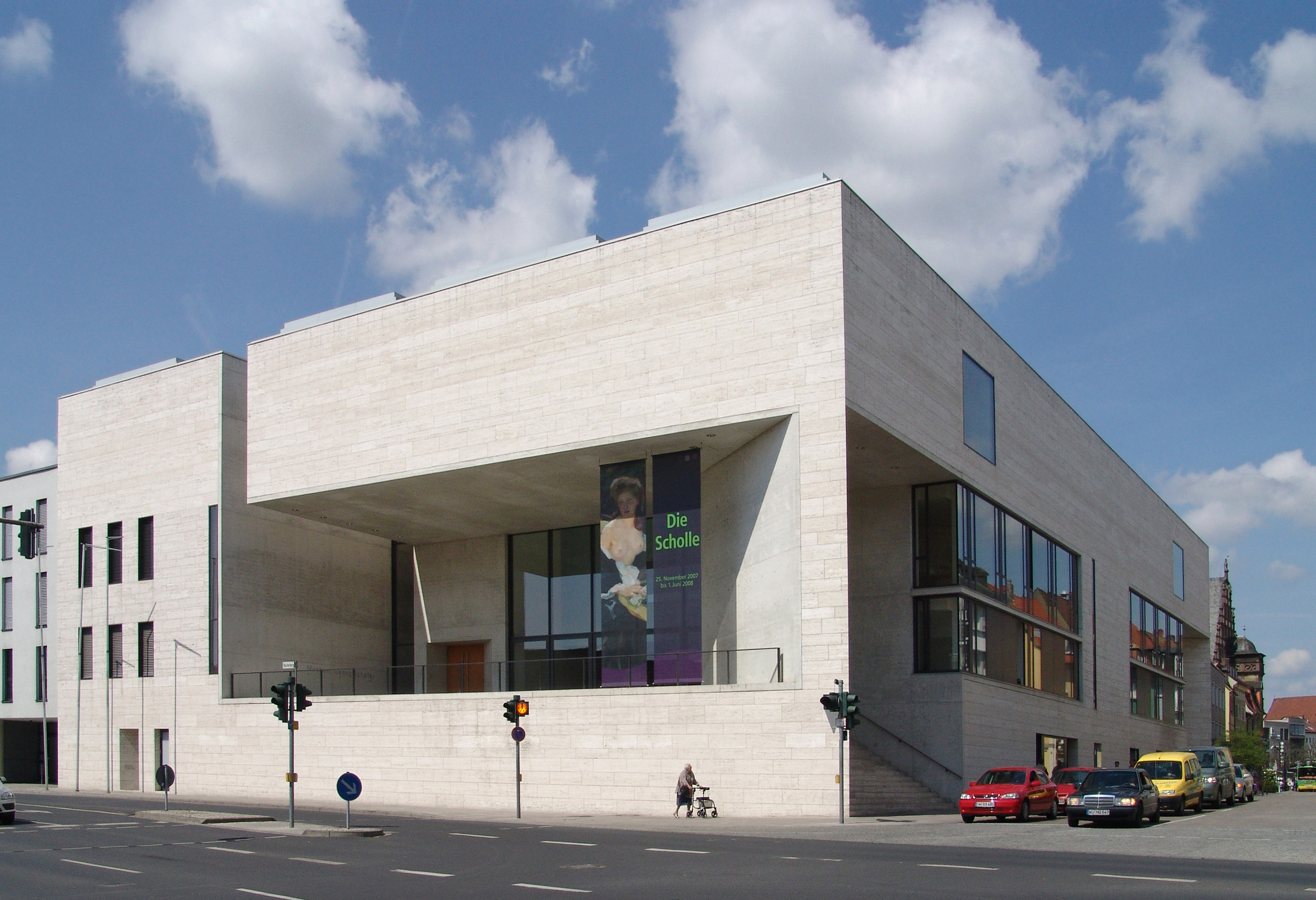
Museum Georg Schäfer

The Museum Georg Schäfer is a German art museum in Schweinfurt, Bavaria. Based on the private art collection of German industrialist Georg Schäfer (1896–1975), the museum primarily collects 19th-century paintings by artists from German-speaking countries.

== History ==
Having already inherited a nucleus of 19th-century German and Austrian paintings from his father, in the 1950s Georg Schäfer began actively collecting paintings by old masters and forgotten "lesser" masters which, at that time, were being overlooked by the more conservative regional art centres of Munich, Berlin, Dresden and Vienna. He bought much of the art in the 1950s from dealers in Munich, including from Heinrich Hoffmann, Adolf Hitler's personal photographer, who was deeply involved in Nazi-looted art.

As early as 1959, architect Erich Schelling drew up plans for a museum to house the collection. A later design by Mies van der Rohe was rejected when the Schweinfurt city council declined to assume the cost of maintaining the museum. The plans were later adapted for the Neue Nationalgalerie in Berlin.

The city of Schweinfurt and the Schäfer family finally came to an agreement on housing the collection in a museum in 1988, but those plans were delayed due to a financial crisis in the FAG Kugelfischer company, which led Schäfer's heirs to mortgage the art collection. By the end of 1997 the family had regained control of much of the collection and established a foundation to protect it. City officials meanwhile secured resources for the museum, and in February 1997 Volker Staab won the commission to design the museum.

The museum is situated next to the city hall (Rathaus) at the southern entry to downtown Schweinfurt and was opened to the public on 23 September 2000.

== Collection ==
- The museum is home to 950 paintings, 270 of which are on constant display.
- The museum has the world's most comprehensive collection of works by Carl Spitzweg, including 160 paintings and 110 drawings.
- Other artists represented in the collection are Caspar David Friedrich, Ferdinand Georg Waldmüller, Carl Rottmann, Domenico Quaglio the Younger, Albrecht Adam, Wilhelm von Kobell, Fritz von Uhde, Wilhelm Leibl, Adolph Menzel, Franz von Lenbach, Hans Thoma, Lovis Corinth, Max Liebermann, Max Slevogt, and Max Beckmann.

== Works in the collection ==
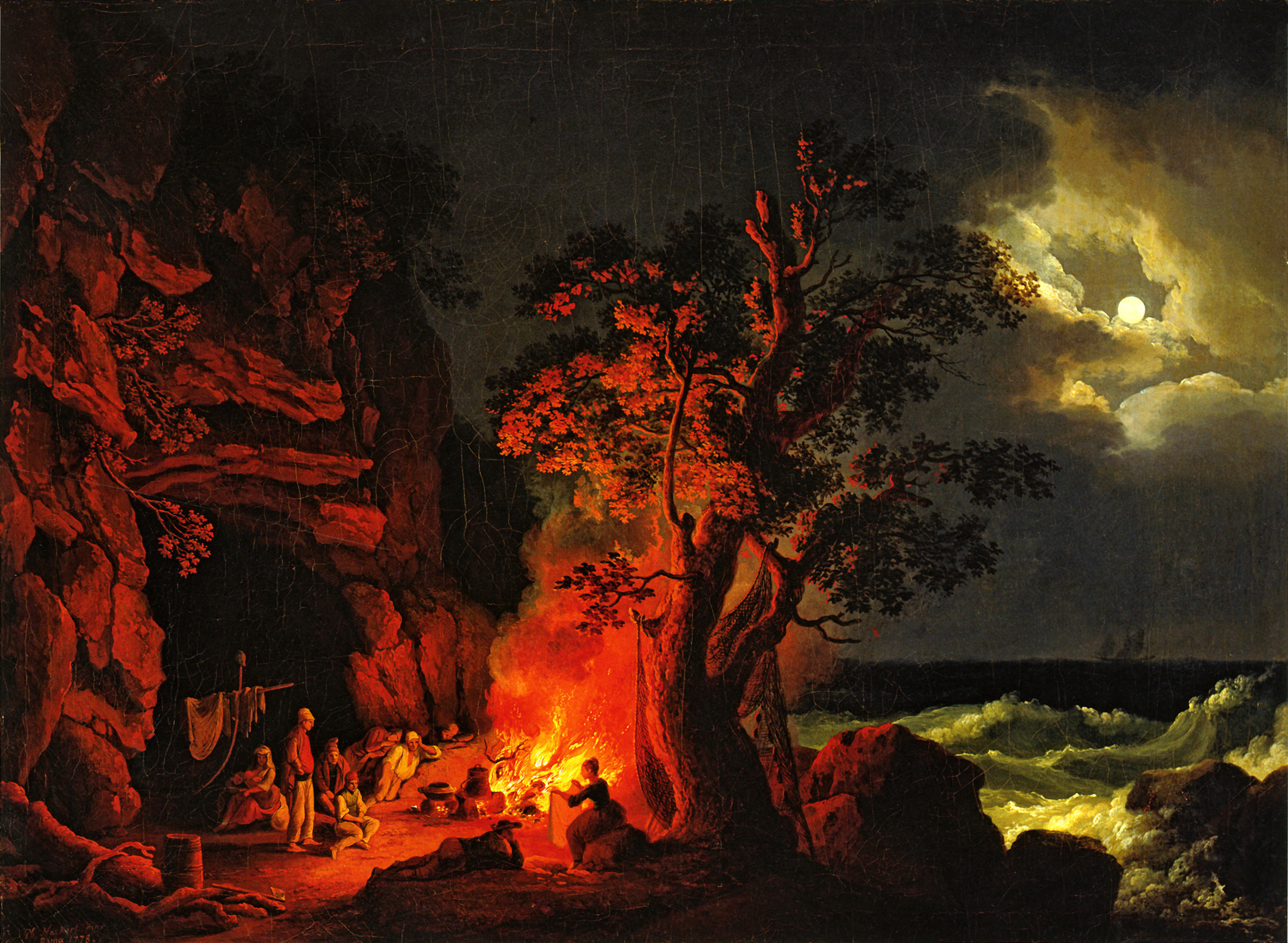
Jakob Philipp Hackert: The Fischer Family at Night Bonfire with Roaring Sea, 1778

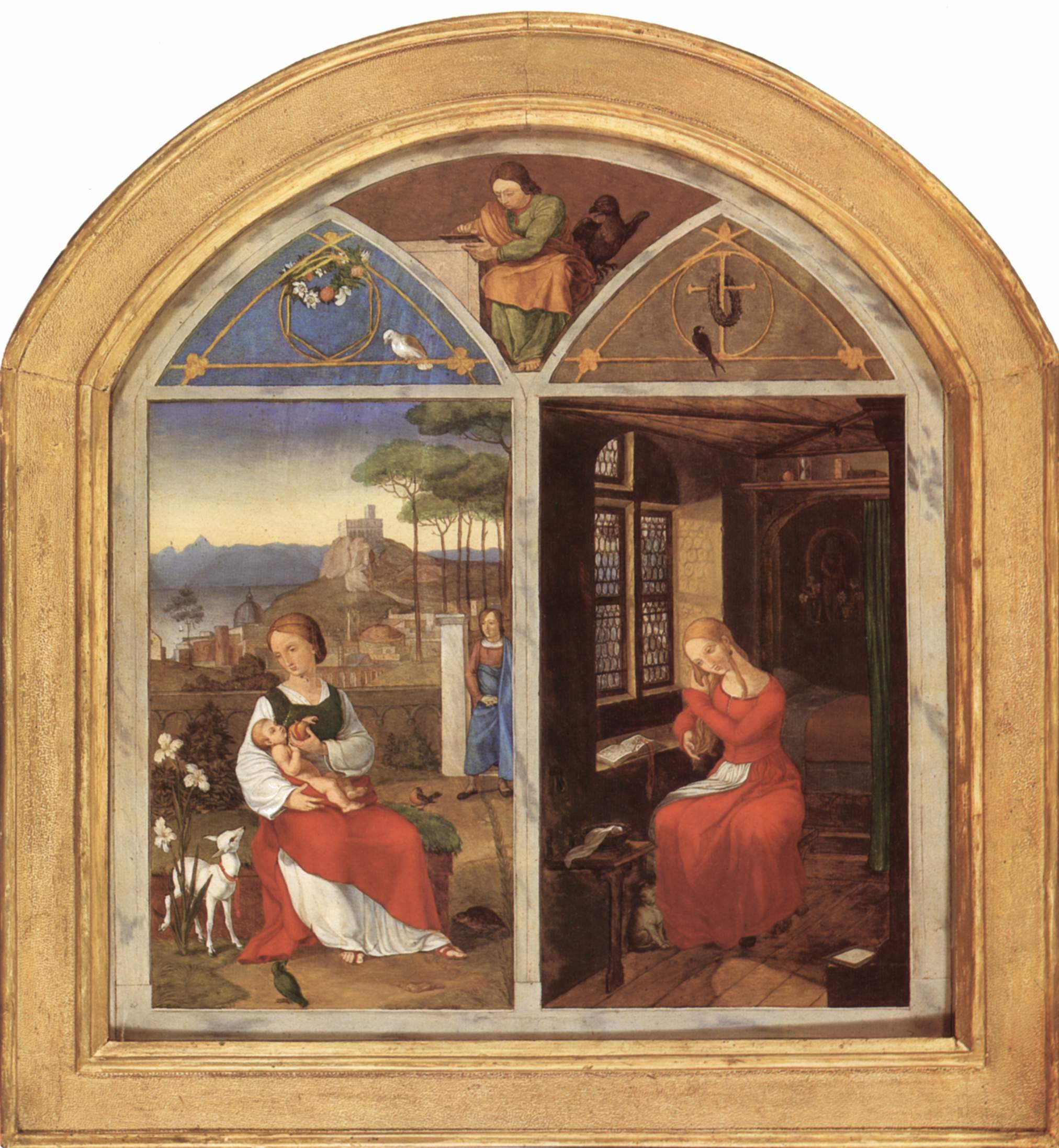
Franz Pforr: Sulamith and Maria, 1811

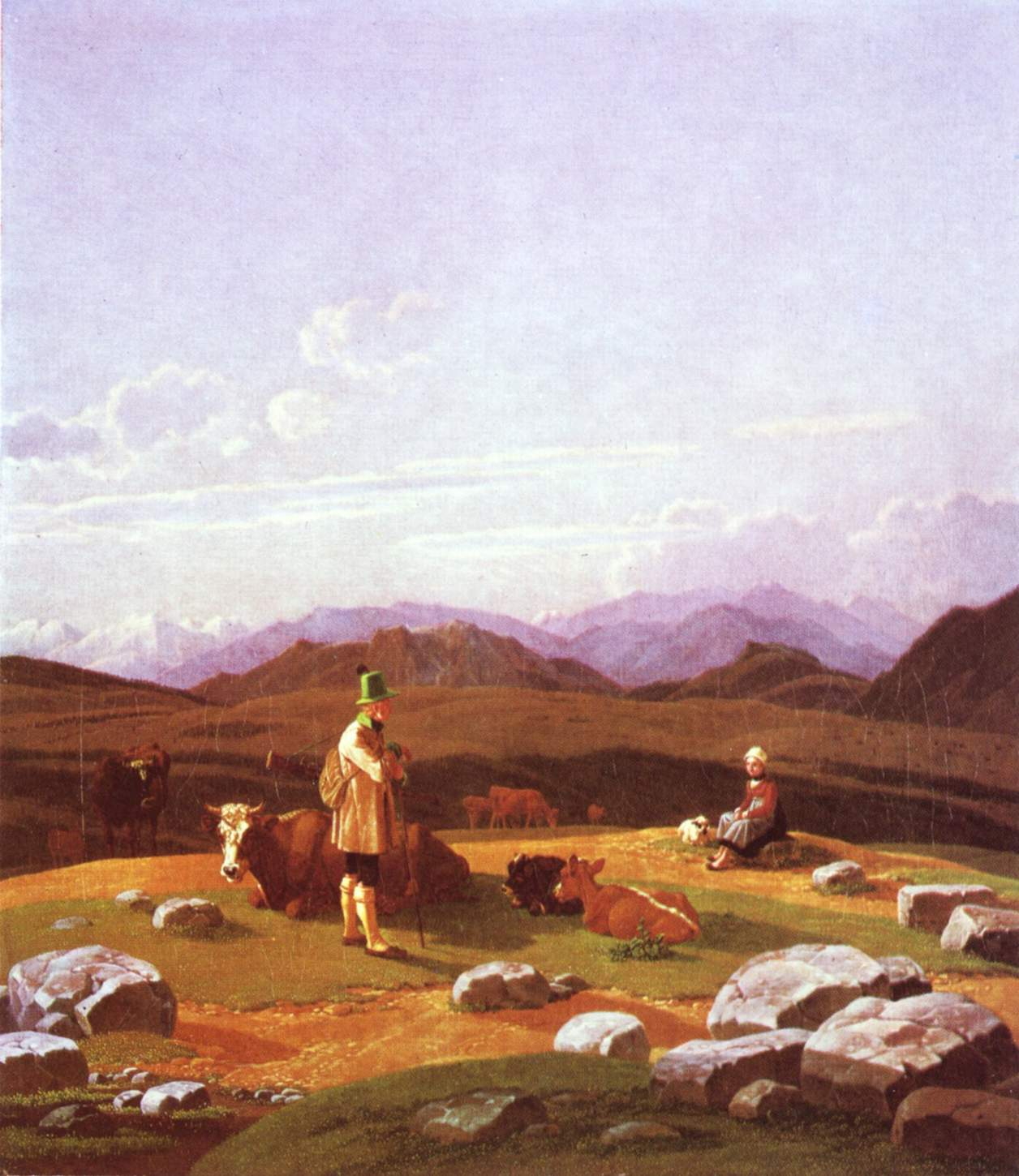
Wilhelm von Kobell: Hunters in the Alps, 1828

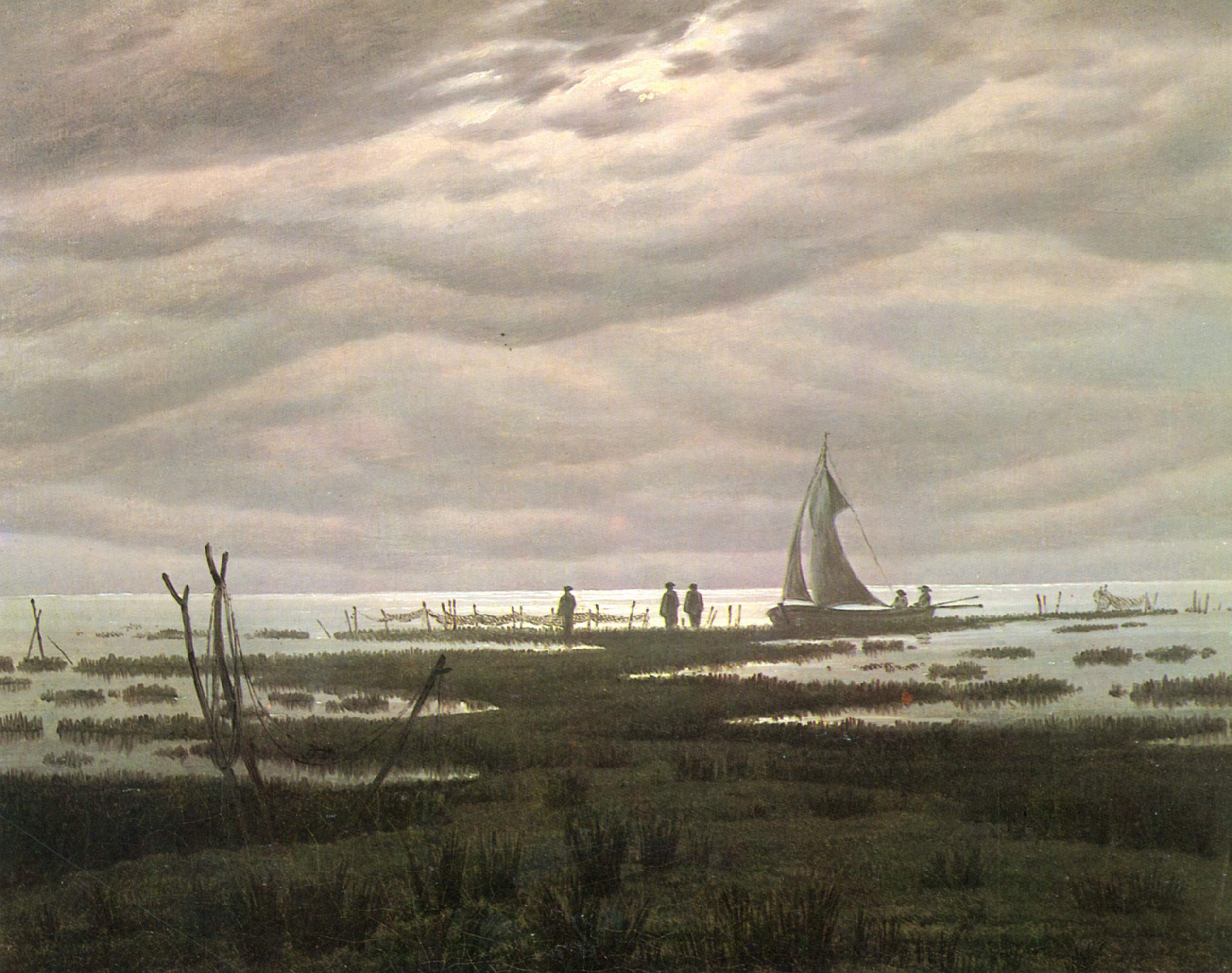
Caspar David Friedrich: Flat Landscape on the Bay of Greifswald (Seascape, Evening on the Baltic Sea), ca. 1830–1834

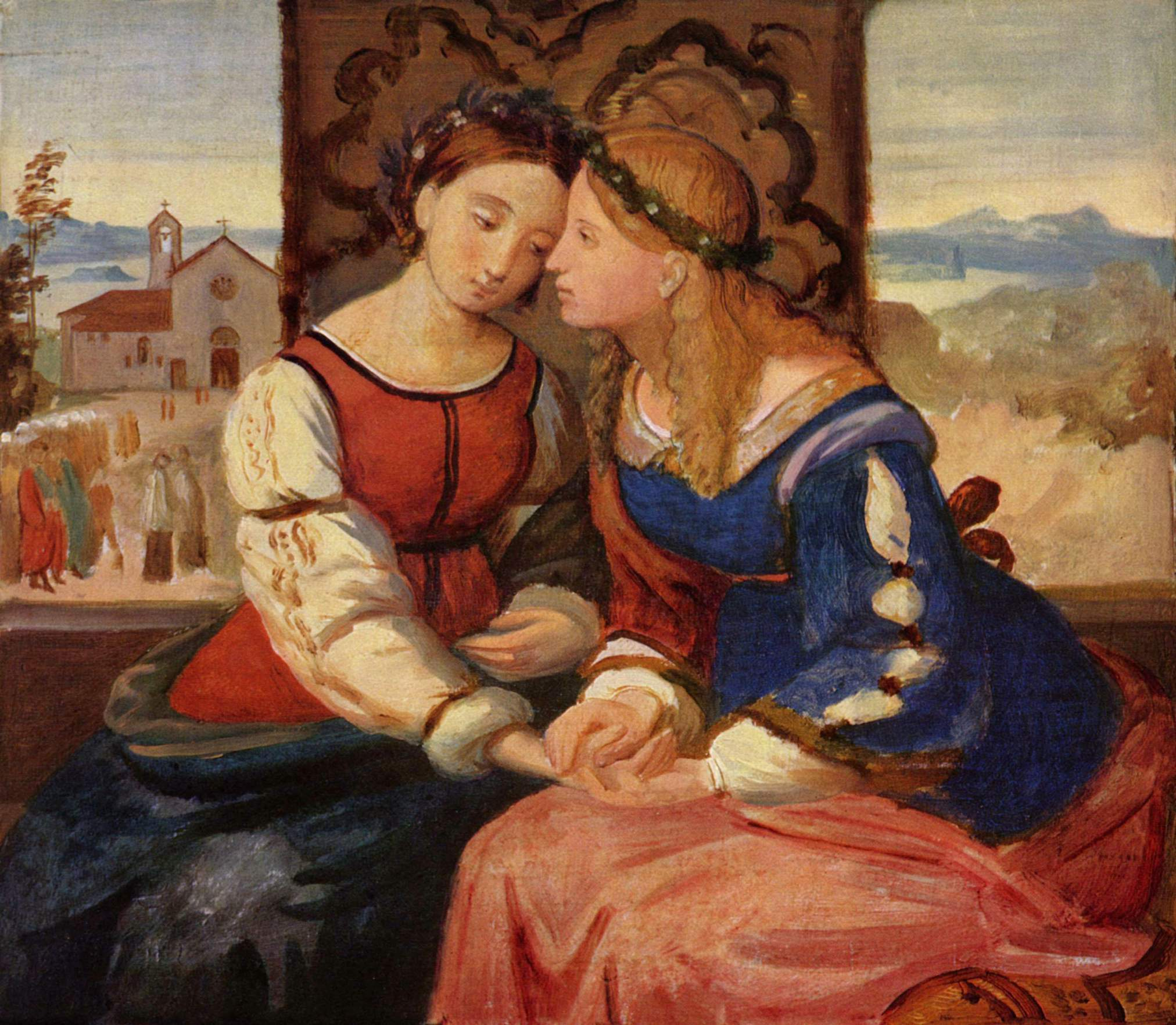
Friedrich Overbeck: Italy and Germany, 1840 to 1850

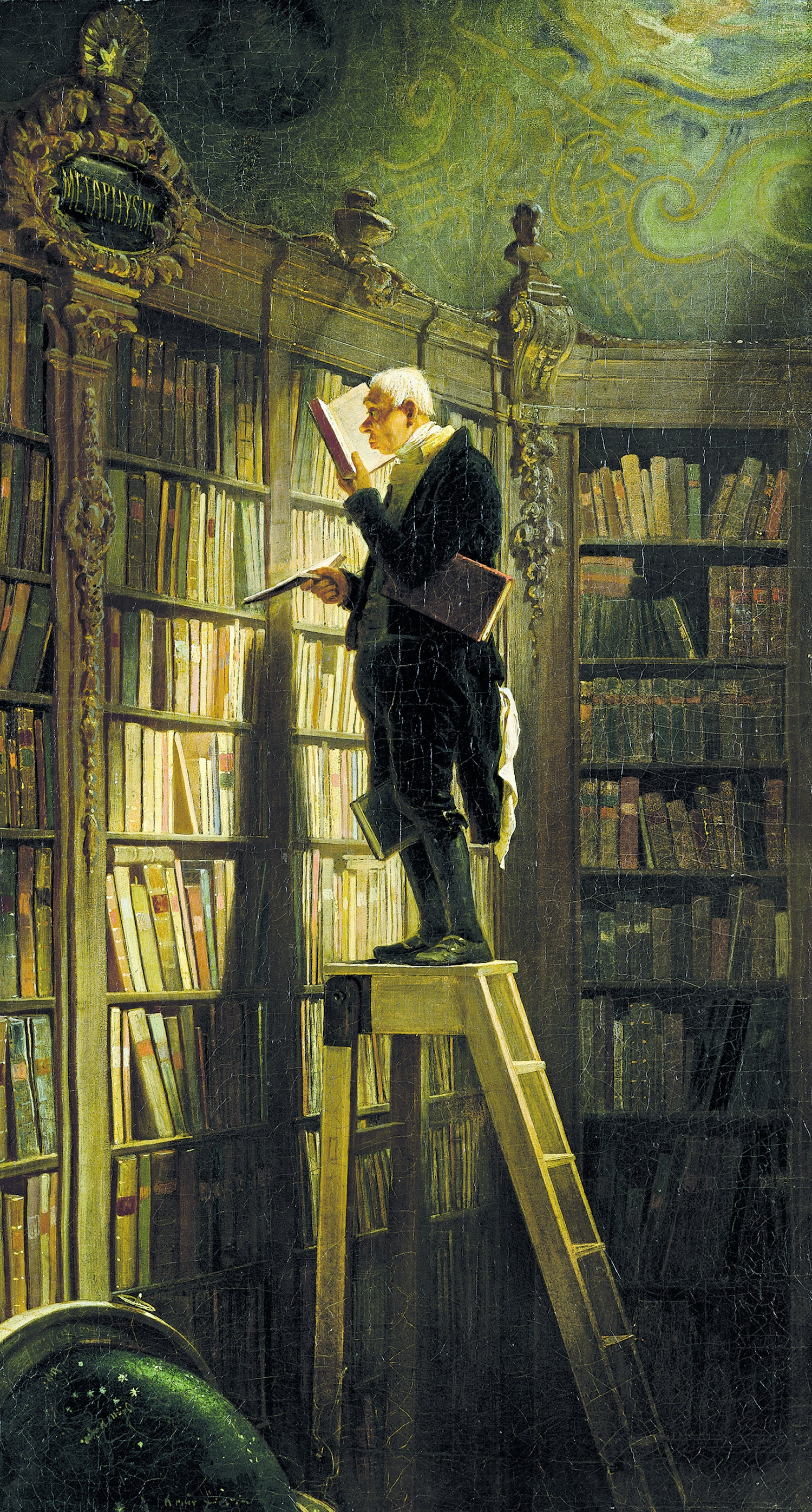
The Bookworm (1st version), ca.1850 by Carl Spitzweg

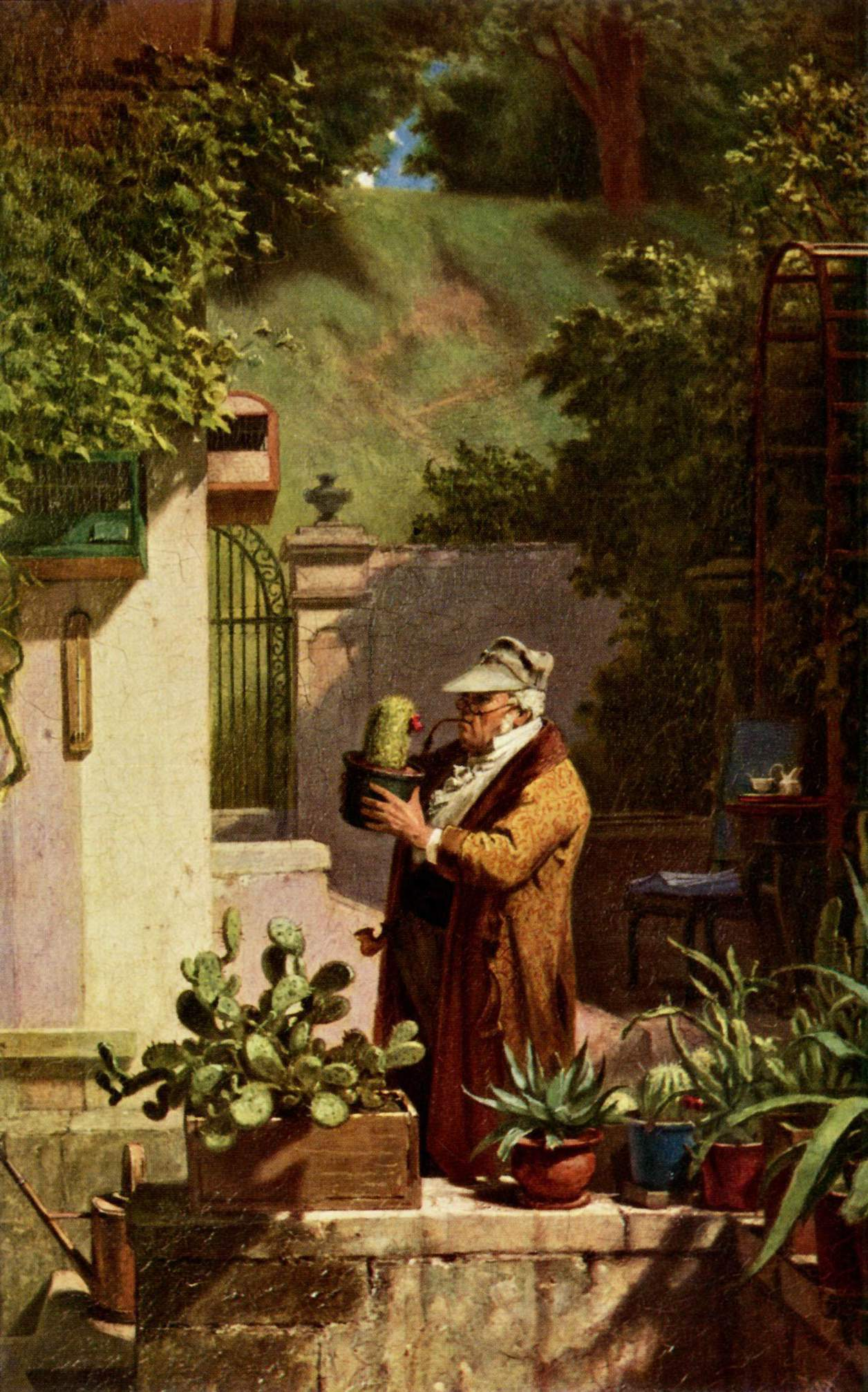
Carl Spitzweg: The Cactus Friend, before 1858

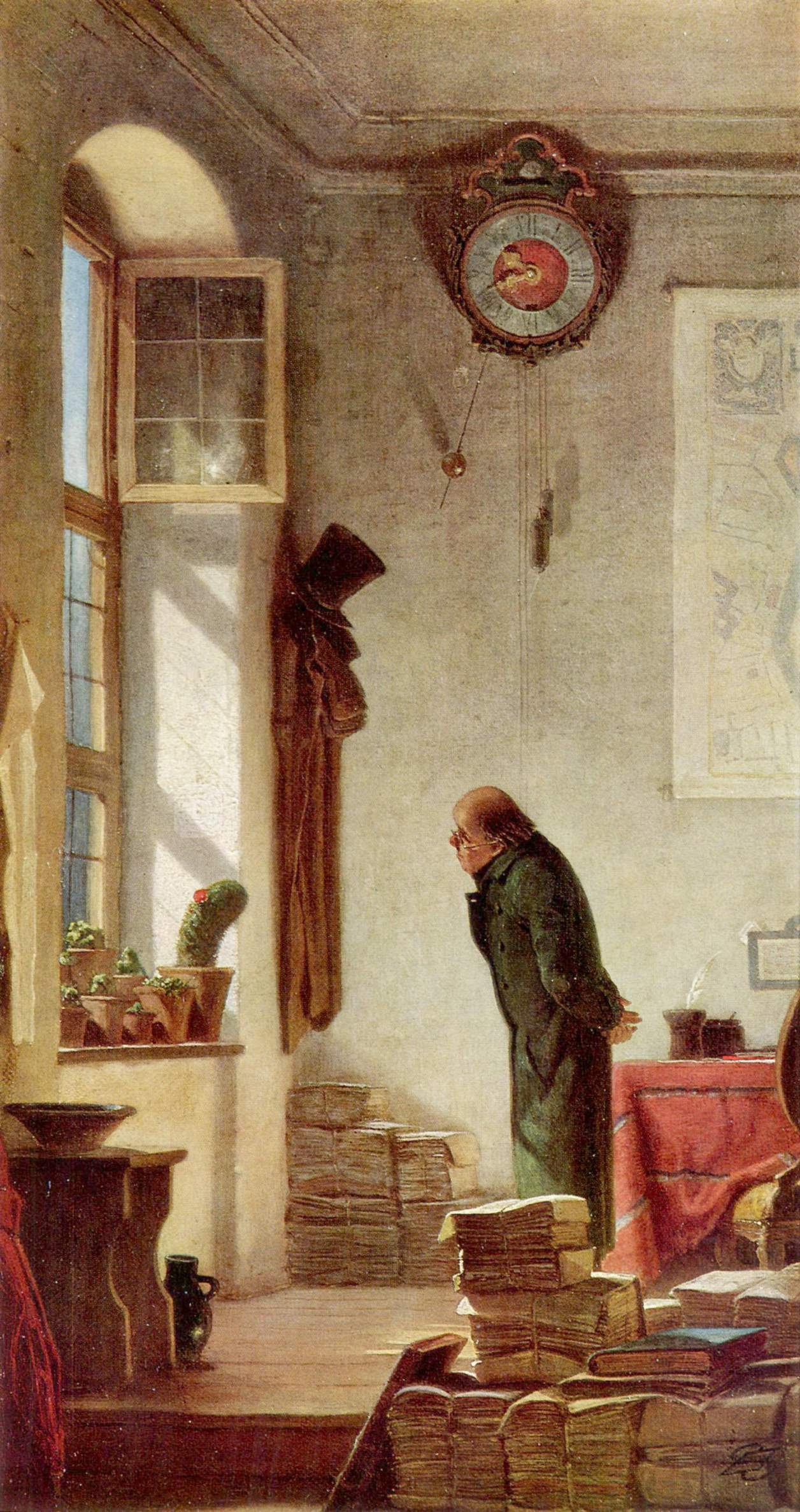
Carl Spitzweg:
Der Kaktusliebhaber

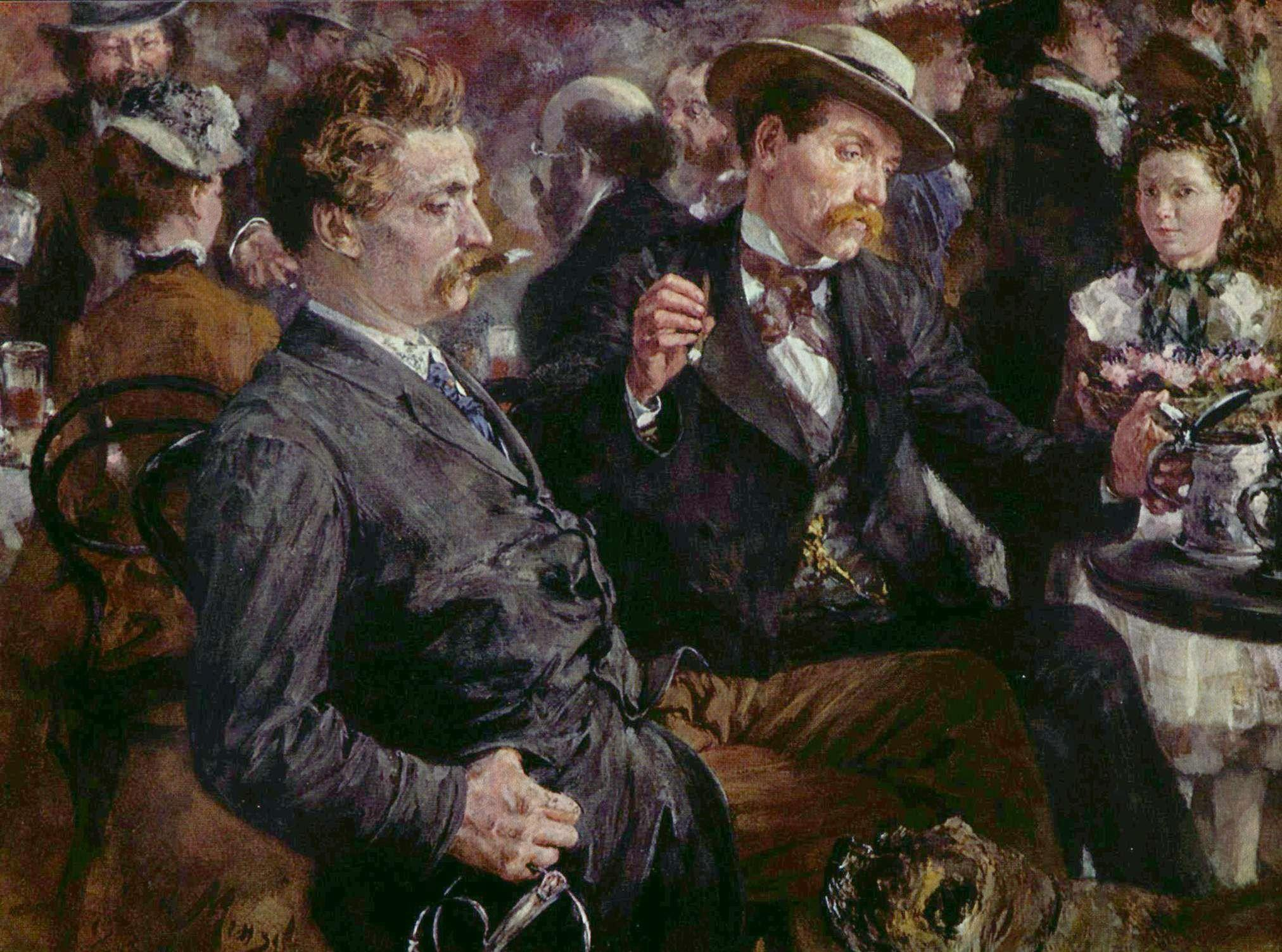
Adolph von Menzel: The Beer Garden, 1883

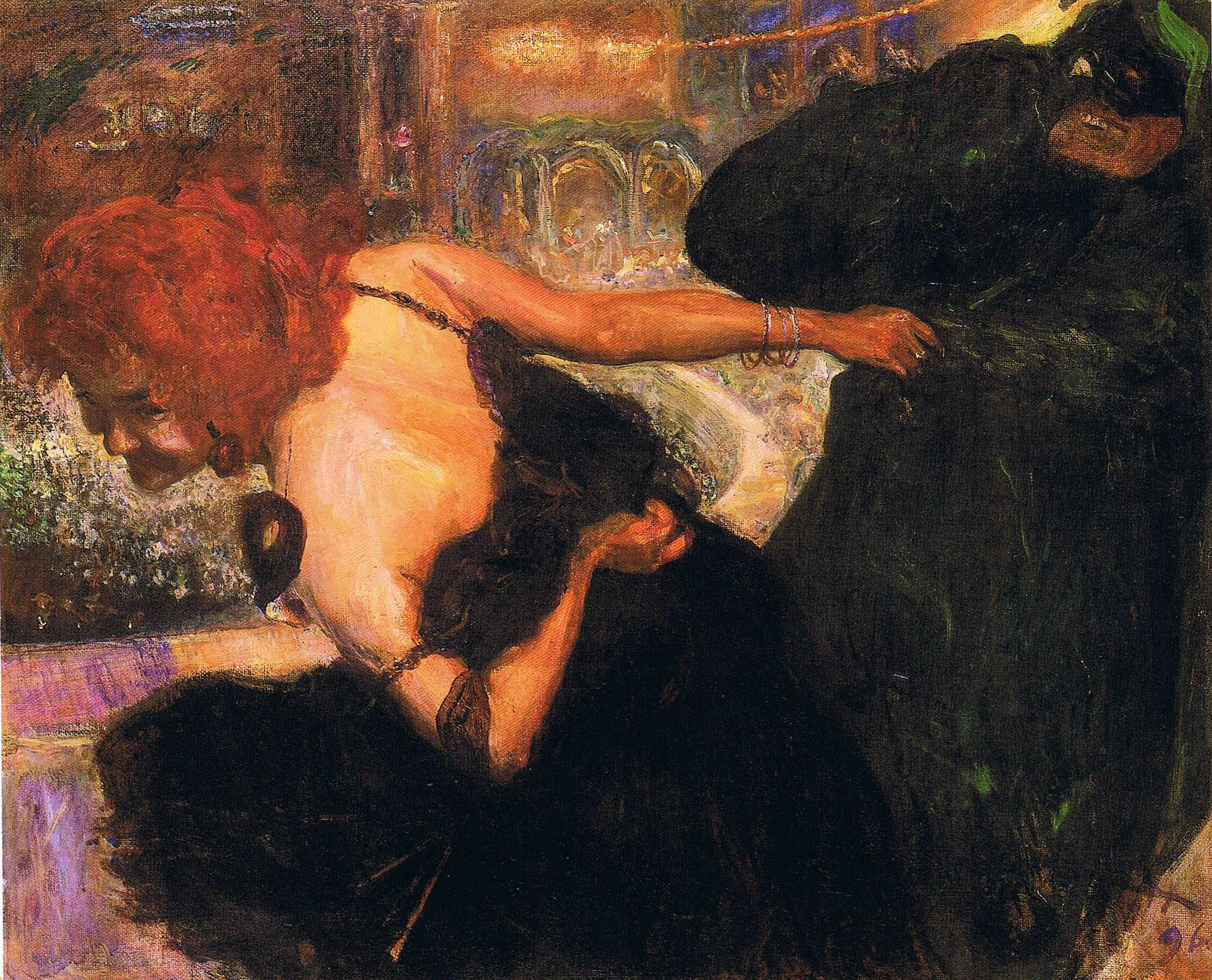
Max Slevogt: Death Dance, 1896

== Nazi looted art ==
Provenance research into the ownership history of 1000 artworks in the Georg Schäfer collection was launched in 2016 after the museum received Nazi-era linked restitution claims for 23 artworks. Provenance researcher Sibylle Ehringhaus investigated the collection for three years but resigned in 2020, saying that she had identified several plundered works, but that no one at the museum seemed to have any plans to return them to the heirs of the original Jewish owners. Carl Blechen's "Klosterhof mit Kreuzgang" (Monastery Courtyard with Cloister) appeared as lost property in the Lost Art Database of the Zentrum für Kulturgutverluste and had an adhesive label on the back documenting its ownership by Jewish collectors Bertrand and Martha Nothmann. In 2021, Germany proposed a law to make it easier for private foundations to restitute artworks lost due to Nazi persecution.
