= Georg Schäfer (industrialist) =

German businessman, art collector and Nazi (1896–1975)

- Born: September 7, 1896; Schweinfurt, German Empire
- Died: January 27, 1975 (aged 78); Erlangen, West Germany
- Occupation: Industrialist
- Known for: Large collection of paintings by 19th-century German artists

Georg Schäfer (September 7, 1896, in Schweinfurt – January 27, 1975, in Erlangen) was a German industrialist and art collector. After his death, most of his art collection was housed in the Museum Georg Schäfer in Schweinfurt.

== Early life ==
Upon the death in 1929 of his father (also named Georg Schäfer), Georg Schäfer (II) inherited a one-third interest in the Friedrich Fischer steel ball bearings firm.

== Career ==
=== Friedrich Fisher Steel ===
At age 29 Schäfer became the commercial head of the firm, while his brother-in law Hermann Barthel directed the technical side. In 1929 the firm did not join a merger of Swedish and German ball bearing manufacturers. At first, this was seen as a setback. But as the government of Adolf Hitler prepared for war, the Fischer firm's independence allowed it to join the Nazi armament campaign, and this caused a rapid expansion for the firm.

=== Nazis and World War II ===
By 1933 Schäfer was a Nazi city councillor in Schweinfurt and leader of the "Sonderring Wälzlager" (Ball Bearing Special Circle) which oversaw the supply of ball bearings in the German armament campaign.

In 1939 Schäfer ousted Hermann Barthel from the firm. With his brother, Otto Schäfer, he expanded wartime production by the firm, which changed its name to "Fischers Aktien-Gesellschaft (FAG) Kugelfischer." Despite Allied bombardments of Schweinfurt during World War II, the Kugelfischer firm continued to make ball bearings, employing 11,700 employees at the end of the war, including thousands of enslaved laborers. Georg Schäfer supposedly shielded his Jewish sales director, Hugo Holzapfel, from detention by the anti-Jewish Nazis.

=== After the war ===
Georg and Otto Schäfer presided over the revival and expansion of FAG Kugelfischer during the Wirtschaftswunder era of the 1950s.

== Death and legacy ==
At Georg Schäfer's death in 1975, FAG Kugelfischer employed some 35,000 workers around the world.

Schäfer's heirs left the business during a financial crisis in 1993, and in 2001 the company merged with the Schaeffler Group in a hostile takeover.

Among the honors awarded to Georg Schäfer are the Great Federal Cross of Merit, the Bavarian Order of Merit, and an honorary doctorate from the Technical University of Munich.

== Art collection ==
In the 1950s Schäfer assembled a large collection of paintings by 19th-century German artists. Efforts to house the collection in a public museum in Schweinfurt began in the 1950s, but city officials and Schäfer's heirs did not reach an agreement until 1988. The family temporarily lost control of the collection during the 1993 FAG Kugelfischer financial crisis. In 1997 Schäfer's heirs established a foundation to protect the recovered portion of the collection, and in 2000 the Museum Georg Schäfer opened to the public. Not all of the foundation's paintings are housed in the museum.

In 2003 the Schäfer collection foundation loaned 42 16th-century German paintings to the State of Bavaria for display in the Veste Coburg castle.

=== Nazi loot in the Schäfer collection ===
Several artworks acquired by Georg Schäfer have been linked to Nazi looting, including artworks donated to the Kunsthalle zu Kiel. In 2016 the Georg Schäfer museum created a provenance research position.

However, in 2020, the provenance researcher resigned, saying that she had been denied access to historical documents and that no one seemed to have any plans to return Nazi-plundered works to the heirs of the original Jewish owners. "They needed me for appearances." she told the New York Times. "I felt as though I was being used as a fig leaf."
