= Franz Pforr =

German painter

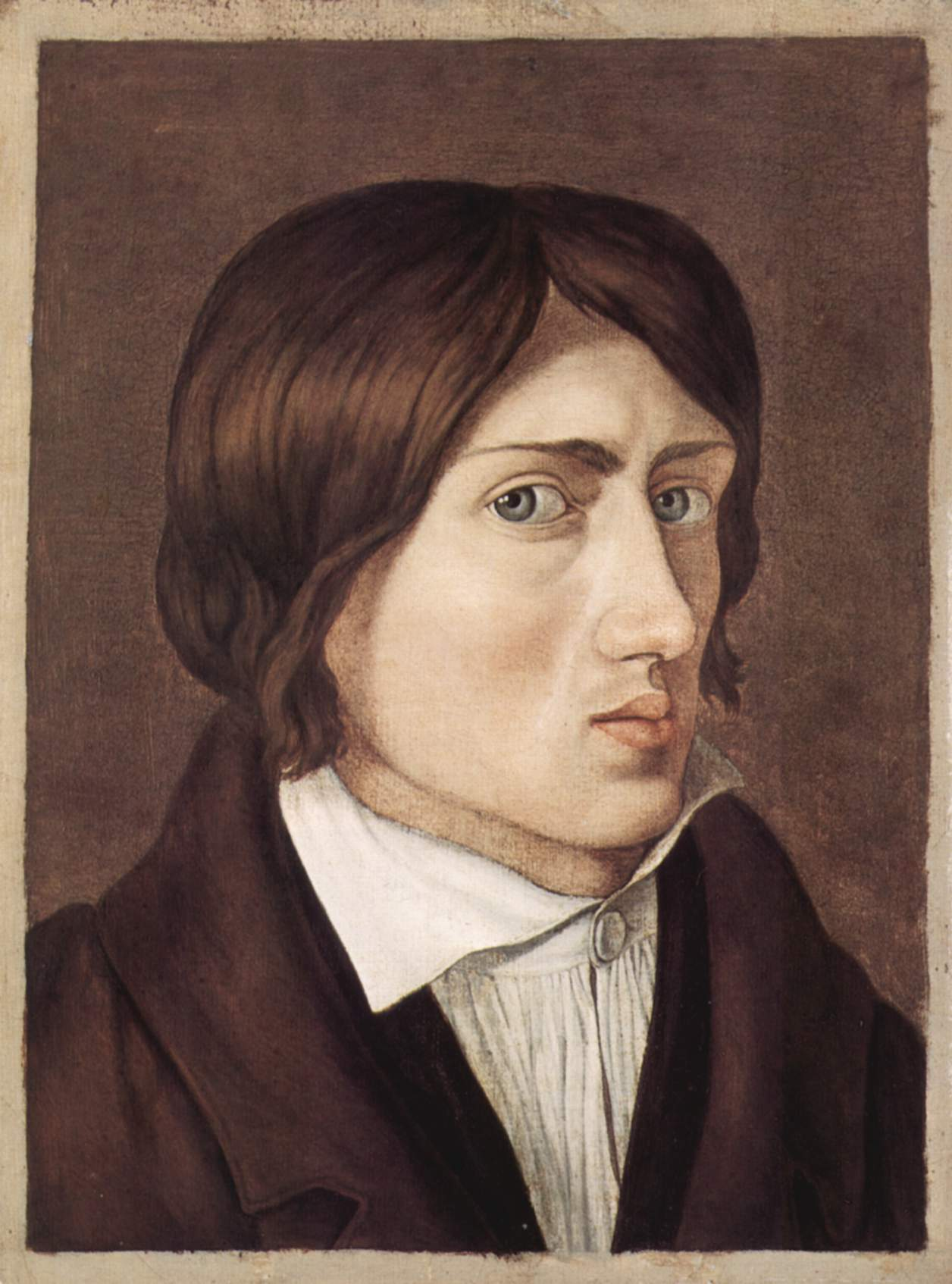
- Self-portrait by Pforr (1810)
- Born: 5 April 1788; Frankfurt, Holy Roman Empire
- Died: 12 June 1812 (aged 24); Albano Laziale, French Empire
- Known for: Painting
- Movement: Nazarene

Franz Pforr (5 April 1788 – 16 June 1812) was a painter of the German Nazarene movement.

== Biography ==
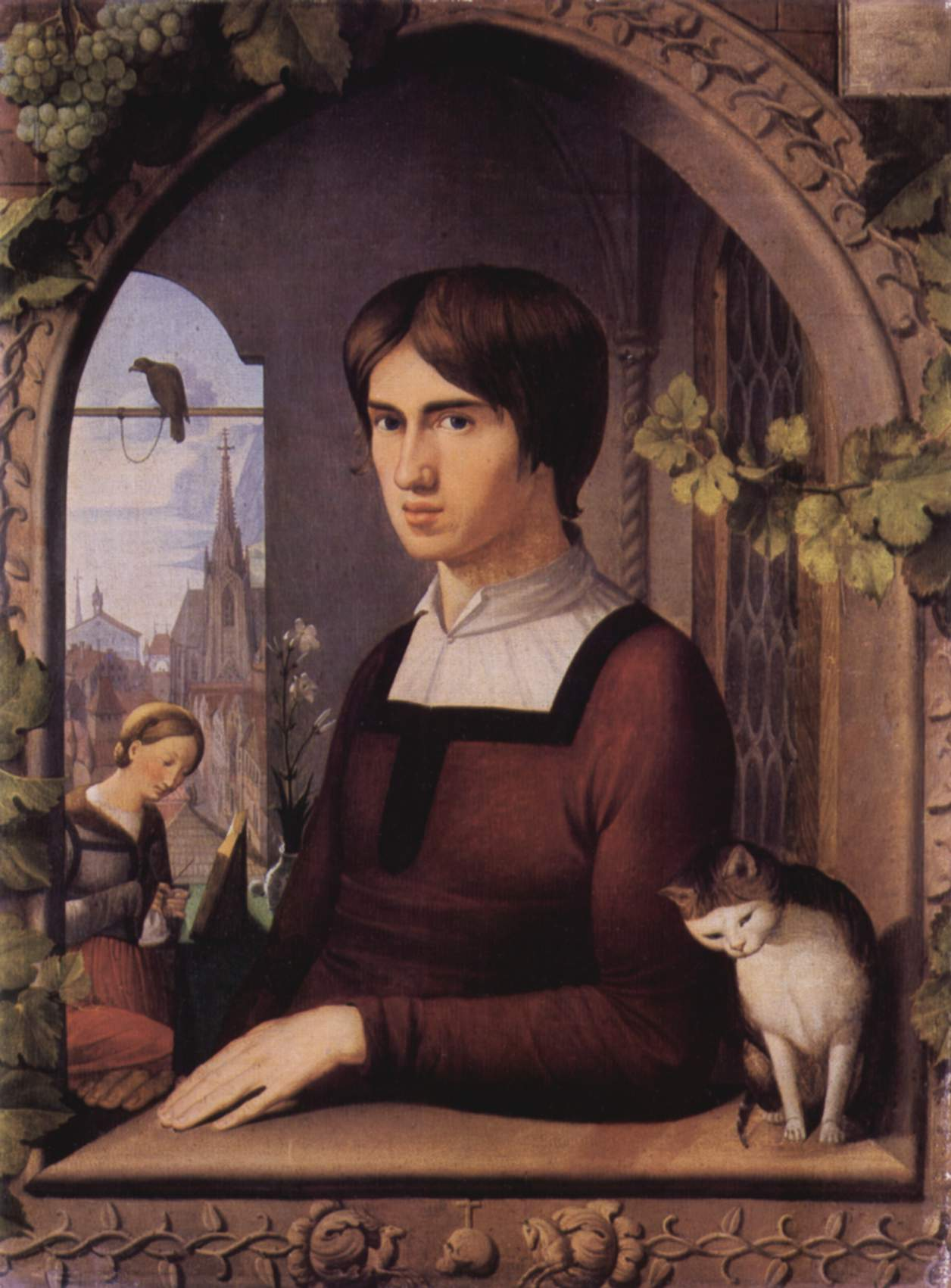
Portrait by Johann Friedrich Overbeck, 1810

He was born in Frankfurt am Main. He received his earliest training from his father, the painter Johann Georg Pforr (1745–98), and his uncle, the art professor and first inspector of the painting gallery in Kassel, Johann Heinrich Tischbein the Younger (1742–1808). While studying at the Academy of Fine Arts, Vienna, Pforr moved in 1810 to Rome in the company of other students, including Johann Friedrich Overbeck, Ludwig Vogel and Johann Konrad Hottinger. Looking for lost spirituality in their art, they lived at the abandoned monastery of Sant’Isidoro a Capo le Case.

Pforr did not live long enough to see his art acknowledged. He died of tuberculosis in Albano Laziale, Rome at age 24.

== Literature ==
Stemmler, Gunter: "Die „Bürgermeisterkette“ in Franz Pforrs Gemälde ´Der Einzug des Königs Rudolf von Habsburg in Basel 1273´. Anregungen, Vorlagen und historische Hinweise", in Städel-Jahrbuch, n.s., 20, 2009, pp. 219–236

Thommen, Heinrich: Im Schatten des Freundes: Arbeitsmaterialien von Franz Pforr im Nachlass Ludwig Vogels. Schwabe Verlag, Basel, 2010, (Schriften der Stiftung für Kunst des 19. Jahrhunderts Olten), ISBN 978-3-7965-2700-5.
