= National Register of Historic Places listings in Salt Lake City =

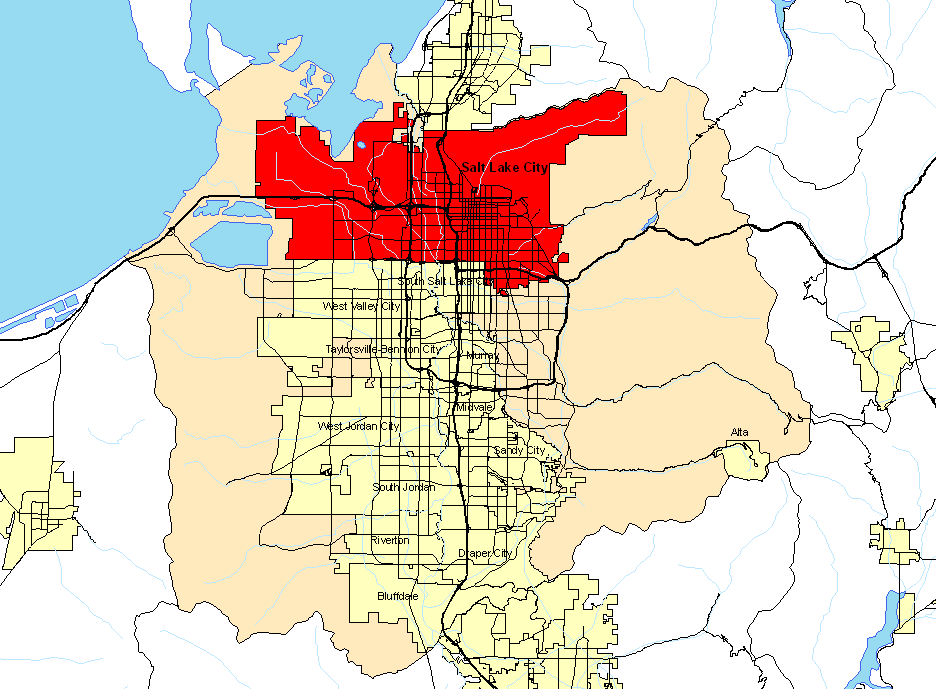
Salt Lake City and its surrounding area

This is a list of the National Register of Historic Places listings in Salt Lake City, Utah.

This is intended to be a complete list of the properties and districts on the National Register of Historic Places in Salt Lake City, Utah, United States. Latitude and longitude coordinates are provided for many National Register properties and districts; these locations may be seen together in an online map.

There are more than 350 properties and districts listed on the National Register in Salt Lake County, including 6 National Historic Landmarks. 231 of these sites, including 4 National Historic Landmarks, are located in Salt Lake City, and are listed here; the remaining sites, including 2 National Historic Landmarks, are listed separately. Another 19 sites in the city were once listed or determined eligible for listing, but have since been removed.

This National Park Service list is complete through NPS recent listings posted November 6, 2026.

== Current listings ==
	Name on the Register	Image	Date listed	Location	Neighborhood	Description
1	19th Ward Meetinghouse and Relief Society Hall	19th Ward Meetinghouse and Relief Society Hall	May 28, 1976 (#76001820)	168 W. 500 North; 40°46′49″N 111°53′42″W	Capitol Hill	
2	Altadena Apartments	Altadena Apartments	January 27, 2010 (#09001291)	310 S. 300 East; 40°45′45″N 111°52′58″W	Central City	
3	Fortunato Anselmo House	Fortunato Anselmo House	May 21, 1979 (#79002499)	164 S. 900 East; 40°45′56″N 111°51′54″W	Central City	
4	George Arbuckle House	George Arbuckle House	February 12, 1982 (#82004130)	747 E. 1700 South; 40°44′02″N 111°52′08″W	Sugar House	
5	Armista Apartments	Armista Apartments	October 20, 1989 (#89001736)	555 E. 100 South; 40°46′04″N 111°52′02″W	Central City	
6	Francis Armstrong House	Francis Armstrong House	May 23, 1980 (#80003914)	667 E. 100 South; 40°46′03″N 111°52′16″W	Central City	
7	Ashby Apartments	Ashby Apartments	November 16, 2006 (#06001067)	358 E. 100 South; 40°46′01″N 111°52′49″W	Central City	
8	Avenues Historic District	Avenues Historic District	August 27, 1980 (#80003915)	Roughly bounded by 1st and 9th Aves. and State and Virginia Sts. 40°46′23″N 111°52′10″W	Avenues	
9	B'nai Israel Temple	B'nai Israel Temple	November 16, 1978 (#78002666)	249 S. 400 East; 40°45′48″N 111°52′42″W	Central City	
10	Charles Baldwin House	Charles Baldwin House	February 11, 1982 (#82004131)	229 S. 1200 East; 40°45′52″N 111°51′21″W	University	
11	Simon Bamberger House	Simon Bamberger House	May 30, 1975 (#75001814)	623 E. 100 South; 40°46′03″N 111°52′19″W	Central City	Simon Bamberger was governor of Utah 1917–1921.
12	Jeremiah Beattie House	Jeremiah Beattie House	July 7, 1983 (#83004421)	655 E. 200 South; 40°45′55″N 111°52′19″W	Central City	
13	Beehive House	Beehive House	February 26, 1970 (#70000626)	67 E. South Temple St. 40°46′11″N 111°53′19″W	Downtown	
14	William F. Beer Estate	William F. Beer Estate	December 6, 1977 (#77001306)	181 B St. and 222 4th Ave. 40°46′24″N 111°52′52″W	Avenues	
15	Ebenezer Beesley House	Ebenezer Beesley House	July 16, 1979 (#79002500)	80 W. 300 North; 40°46′35″N 111°53′34″W	Capitol Hill	
16	Belvedere Apartments	Belvedere Apartments	May 8, 2012 (#12000271)	29 S. State St. 40°46′07″N 111°53′17″W	Downtown	Salt Lake City Multiple Property Submission
17	Howard and Marian Bennion House	Howard and Marian Bennion House	August 27, 2013 (#13000640)	2136 E. Hubbard Ave. 40°44′55″N 111°49′49″W	Foothill	
18	Benworth-Chapman Apartments and Chapman Cottages	Benworth-Chapman Apartments and Chapman Cottages	December 30, 2004 (#04001417)	227 S. 400 East; 40°45′51″N 111°52′45″W	Central City	
19	Bertolini Block	Bertolini Block	September 29, 1976 (#76001822)	143½ W. 200 South; 40°45′53″N 111°53′41″W	Downtown	
20	Best-Cannon House	Best-Cannon House	October 3, 1980 (#80003916)	1146 S. 900 East; 40°44′42″N 111°51′32″W	9th and 9th	
21	Bigelow Apartments	Bigelow Apartments	December 30, 2004 (#04001418)	225 S. 400 East; 40°45′50″N 111°52′43″W	Central City	
22	Booth-Parsons House	Booth-Parsons House	May 9, 2012 (#12000272)	1884 S. 900 East; 40°43′45″N 111°51′56″W	Sugar House	
23	Boulevard Gardens Historic District	Boulevard Gardens Historic District	December 31, 2018 (#100003268)	Roughly bounded by Quayle Ave., Main and W. Temple Sts. 40°43′53″N 111°53′33″W	Ballpark	
24	Broadway Hotel	Broadway Hotel	August 17, 1982 (#82004132)	222 W. 300 South; 40°45′47″N 111°53′49″W	Downtown	
25	Building at Rear, 537 West 200 South	Building at Rear, 537 West 200 South	December 27, 1982 (#82004849)	Rear, 537 W. 200 South; 40°45′52″N 111°54′21″W	Central City West	
26	Building at 561 West 200 South	Building at 561 West 200 South	December 27, 1982 (#82004848)	561 W. 200 South; 40°45′54″N 111°54′24″W	Central City West	
27	George M. Cannon House	George M. Cannon House	July 18, 1983 (#83004419)	720 E. Ashton Ave. 40°43′10″N 111°52′11″W	Sugar House	
28	Capitol Building	Capitol Building	October 11, 1978 (#78002667)	Capitol Hill; 40°46′38″N 111°53′17″W	Capitol Hill	
29	Capitol Hill Historic District	Capitol Hill Historic District	August 2, 1982 (#82004135)	Roughly bounded by Beck, Main and Wall Sts., 300 North, Victory Rd., and Capitol Blvd.; also roughly bounded by 300 North, 400 West, 800 North, Wall St., and 200 West; 40°46′43″N 111°53′33″W	Capitol Hill	Second set of boundaries represents a boundary increase
30	Cathedral of the Madeleine	Cathedral of the Madeleine	March 11, 1971 (#71000845)	331 E. South Temple St. 40°46′12″N 111°52′52″W	Avenues	
31	Centennial Home	Centennial Home	September 7, 2001 (#01000960)	307 Virginia St. 40°46′31″N 111°51′06″W	Avenues	
32	Central Warehouse	Central Warehouse	August 17, 1982 (#82004136)	520 W. 200 South; 40°45′55″N 111°54′20″W	Central City West	
33	Chapman Branch Library	Chapman Branch Library	January 20, 1980 (#80003918)	577 S. 900 West; 40°45′24″N 111°54′58″W	Poplar Grove	
34	Isaac Chase Mill	Isaac Chase Mill	June 15, 1970 (#70000627)	Liberty Park, 600 East; 40°44′36″N 111°52′25″W	Liberty Wells	
35	City Creek Canyon Historic District	City Creek Canyon Historic District	March 12, 1980 (#80003919)	Bounded by Capitol Boulevard, A St., 4th Ave. and Canyon Rd. 40°46′49″N 111°52′59″W	City Creek Canyon	
36	Isaac C. and Dorothy S. Clark House	Isaac C. and Dorothy S. Clark House	January 11, 2002 (#01001452)	1430 E. Federal Way; 40°46′05″N 111°50′57″W	Federal Heights	
37	Clift Building	Clift Building	August 17, 1982 (#82004139)	272 S. Main St. 40°45′47″N 111°53′27″W	Downtown	
38	Cluff Apartments	Cluff Apartments	October 20, 1989 (#89001739)	1270–1280 E. 200 South; 40°45′53″N 111°51′12″W	University	
39	Henry A. and Tile S. Cohn House	Henry A. and Tile S. Cohn House	August 5, 1996 (#96000871)	1369 E. Westminster Ave. 40°43′46″N 111°51′02″W	Sugar House	
40	Congregation Montefiore Synagogue	Congregation Montefiore Synagogue	June 27, 1985 (#85001395)	355 S. 300 East; 40°45′41″N 111°52′53″W	Central City	
41	Congregation Sharey Tzedek Synagogue	Congregation Sharey Tzedek Synagogue	June 27, 1985 (#85001396)	833 S. 200 East; 40°45′04″N 111°53′03″W	Central City	
42	Continental Bank Building	Continental Bank Building	December 27, 1982 (#82004850)	200 S. Main St. 40°45′53″N 111°53′27″W	Downtown	
43	Converse Hall	Converse Hall	April 20, 1978 (#78002685)	1840 S. 1300 East; 40°43′55″N 111°51′14″W	Sugar House	The oldest building at Westminster College
44	Cornell Apartments	Cornell Apartments	October 20, 1989 (#89001741)	101 S. 600 East; 40°46′01″N 111°52′25″W	Central City	
45	Corona Apartments	Corona Apartments	October 20, 1989 (#89001742)	335 S. 200 East; 40°45′43″N 111°53′03″W	Central City	
46	Council Hall	Council Hall	May 14, 1971 (#71000846)	Capitol Hill at head of State St. 40°46′33″N 111°53′13″W	Capitol Hill	
47	Almon A. Covey House	Almon A. Covey House	October 3, 1980 (#80003920)	1211 E. 100 South; 40°46′03″N 111°51′21″W	University	
48	Hyrum T. Covey House	Hyrum T. Covey House	October 3, 1980 (#80003921)	1229 E. 100 South; 40°46′03″N 111°51′19″W	University	
49	Cramer House	Cramer House	August 17, 1982 (#82004140)	241 Floral St. 40°45′50″N 111°53′13″W	Central City	
50	Crown Cleaning and Dyeing Company Building	Crown Cleaning and Dyeing Company Building	July 11, 2003 (#03000633)	1989 S. 1100 East; 40°43′40″N 111°51′31″W	Sugar House	
51	William Culmer House	William Culmer House	April 18, 1974 (#74001935)	33 C St. 40°46′14″N 111°52′43″W	Avenues	Now the Sacred Heart Center of the Roman Catholic Diocese of Salt Lake City
52	Byron Cummings House	Byron Cummings House	October 13, 1983 (#83003949)	936 E. 1700 South; 40°44′00″N 111°51′49″W	Perkins Addition	
53	Genevieve & Alexander Curtis House	Genevieve & Alexander Curtis House	September 9, 2010 (#10000730)	1119 E. Westminster Ave. 40°43′46″N 111°51′32″W	Sugar House	
54	Daft Block	Daft Block	May 28, 1976 (#76001823)	128 S. Main St. 40°45′59″N 111°53′26″W	Downtown	
55	Davis Deaconess Home	Davis Deaconess Home	January 24, 1995 (#94001583)	347 S. 400 East; 40°45′41″N 111°52′44″W	Central City	
56	Denver and Rio Grande Railroad Station	Denver and Rio Grande Railroad Station	September 25, 1975 (#75001815)	300 South and Rio Grande; 40°45′46″N 111°54′14″W	Central City West	
57	Devereaux House	Devereaux House	March 11, 1971 (#71000847)	334 W. South Temple St. 40°46′13″N 111°54′02″W	Downtown	
58	Harper J. Dininny House	Harper J. Dininny House	October 13, 1983 (#83003950)	925 E. Logan Ave. 40°44′04″N 111°51′49″W	Perkins Addition	
59	Henry Dinwoodey House	Henry Dinwoodey House	July 24, 1974 (#74001936)	411 E. 100 South; 40°46′04″N 111°52′42″W	Central City	
60	Eagles Building	Eagles Building	September 30, 2019 (#100004480)	404 S. West Temple St. 40°45′37″N 111°53′38″W	Downtown	
61	Exchange Place Historic District	Exchange Place Historic District	August 10, 1978 (#78002669)	Exchange Place and S. Main St. 40°45′38″N 111°53′22″W	Downtown	
62	J. Leo Fairbanks House	J. Leo Fairbanks House	April 26, 1984 (#84002198)	1228 Bryan Ave. 40°44′08″N 111°51′19″W	Sugar House	
63	Felt Electric	Felt Electric	August 17, 1982 (#82004141)	165 S. Regent St. 40°45′55″N 111°53′20″W	Downtown	
64	Fifth Ward Meetinghouse	Fifth Ward Meetinghouse	December 8, 1978 (#78002670)	740 S. 300 West; 40°45′11″N 111°54′00″W	Central City West	
65	Firestation No. 8	Firestation No. 8	July 28, 1983 (#83004423)	258 S. 1300 East; 40°45′49″N 111°51′13″W	University	Built in 1930 to serve the east bench area; now a restaurant.
66	First Church of Christ, Scientist	First Church of Christ, Scientist	July 30, 1976 (#76001824)	352 E. 300 South; 40°45′45″N 111°52′49″W	Central City	
67	First Methodist Episcopal Church	First Methodist Episcopal Church	January 24, 1995 (#94001582)	200 S. 200 East; 40°45′53″N 111°53′06″W	Central City	
68	First National Bank	First National Bank	May 24, 1976 (#76001825)	163 S. Main St. 40°45′56″N 111°53′24″W	Downtown	
69	First Security Bank Building	First Security Bank Building	September 28, 2005 (#05001107)	405 S. Main St. 40°45′36″N 111°53′23″W	Downtown	The first International Style building in Utah, built in 1955
70	Albert Fisher Mansion and Carriage House	Albert Fisher Mansion and Carriage House	October 8, 2008 (#83004675)	1206 W. 200 South; 40°45′55″N 111°55′33″W	Poplar Grove	
71	Ford Motor Company Service Building	Ford Motor Company Service Building	November 2, 2000 (#00001302)	280 S. 400 West; 40°45′47″N 111°54′08″W	Central City West	
72	Forest Dale Historic District	Forest Dale Historic District	April 23, 2009 (#09000241)	Roughly bounded by 700 East, I-80, Commonwealth Ave., and 900 East; 40°43′20″N 111°52′05″W	Sugar House	
73	Fort Douglas	Fort Douglas	June 15, 1970 (#70000628)	Fort Douglas Military Reservation; 40°45′52″N 111°49′58″W	Foothill	
74	J. A. Fritsch Block	J. A. Fritsch Block	July 30, 1976 (#76001826)	158 E. 200 South; 40°45′53″N 111°53′07″W	Central City	
75	W.P. Fuller Paint Company Office and Warehouse	W.P. Fuller Paint Company Office and Warehouse	September 15, 2005 (#05001037)	404 W. 400 South; 40°45′40″N 111°54′08″W	Central City West	
76	George and Ellen Furgis House	George and Ellen Furgis House	July 7, 2015 (#15000399)	2474 E. 9th South Cir. 40°44′59″N 111°49′13″W	Foothill	
77	General Engineering Company Building	General Engineering Company Building	January 21, 1980 (#80003922)	159 W. Pierpont Ave. 40°45′49″N 111°53′44″W	Downtown	
78	Gibbs-Thomas House	Gibbs-Thomas House	July 12, 1984 (#84002202)	137 N. West Temple St. 40°46′22″N 111°53′36″W	Capitol Hill	
79	Gilmer Park Historic District	Gilmer Park Historic District	March 28, 1996 (#96000314)	Roughly bounded by 1100 East, 900 South, 1300 East, and Harvard Ave. 40°44′48″N 111°51′21″W	East Central	
80	Greenwald Furniture Company Building	Greenwald Furniture Company Building	December 27, 1982 (#82004851)	35 W. 300 South; 40°45′45″N 111°53′29″W	Downtown	
81	The Nettie Gregory Center	The Nettie Gregory Center	March 17, 2025 (#100011531)	742 W. South Temple Street; 40°46′10″N 111°54′45″W	Poplar Grove	
82	Nels G. Hall House	Nels G. Hall House	October 3, 1980 (#80003923)	1340 2nd Ave. 40°46′18″N 111°50′56″W	Federal Heights	
83	Nephi J. Hansen House	Nephi J. Hansen House	December 9, 1999 (#99001562)	1797 S. 1400 East; 40°43′51″N 111°51′00″W	Sugar House	
84	Harris Apartments	Harris Apartments	September 24, 1991 (#91001445)	836 S. 500 East; 40°45′03″N 111°52′34″W	Central City	
85	William Hawk Cabin	William Hawk Cabin	December 29, 1978 (#78002671)	458 N. 300 West; 40°46′54″N 111°53′53″W	Capitol Hill	
86	Henderson Block	Henderson Block	January 30, 1978 (#78002672)	375 W. 200 South; 40°45′52″N 111°54′05″W	Central City West	
87	Thomas and Mary Hepworth House	Thomas and Mary Hepworth House	April 21, 2000 (#00000404)	725 W. 200 North; 40°46′25″N 111°54′40″W	Fairpark	
88	Herald Building	Herald Building	July 30, 1976 (#76001827)	165–169 S. Main St. 40°45′56″N 111°53′24″W	Downtown	
89	Highland Park Historic District	Highland Park Historic District	April 23, 1998 (#98000405)	Roughly bounded by Parkway Ave., 1500 East, 2700 South, and Elizabeth St. 40°42′56″N 111°51′07″W	Sugar House	
90	Lewis S. Hills House	Lewis S. Hills House	August 18, 1977 (#77001307)	126 S. 200 West; 40°46′00″N 111°53′47″W	Downtown	
91	Lewis S. Hills House	Lewis S. Hills House	August 3, 1990 (#90001141)	425 E. 100 South; 40°46′03″N 111°52′41″W	Central City	
92	Hollywood Apartments	Hollywood Apartments	April 7, 1994 (#94000302)	234 E. 100 South; 40°46′01″N 111°53′02″W	Central City	
93	Holy Trinity Greek Orthodox Church	Holy Trinity Greek Orthodox Church	July 8, 1975 (#75001816)	279 S. 200 West; 40°45′49″N 111°53′54″W	Downtown	
94	Hotel Utah	Hotel Utah	January 3, 1978 (#78002673)	South Temple and Main St. 40°46′11″N 111°53′23″W	Downtown	Now the Joseph Smith Memorial Building
95	Hotel Victor	Hotel Victor	August 17, 1982 (#82004143)	155 W. 200 South; 40°45′53″N 111°53′42″W	Downtown	
96	Immanuel Baptist Church	Immanuel Baptist Church	December 12, 1978 (#78002668)	401 E. 200 South; 40°45′55″N 111°52′45″W	Central City	
97	Independent Order of Odd Fellows Hall	Independent Order of Odd Fellows Hall	November 7, 1977 (#77001308)	39 W. Market St. 40°45′41″N 111°53′30″W	Downtown	Originally at 26 W. Market St., moved in August 2009
98	Irving Junior High School	Irving Junior High School	December 22, 1978 (#78002674)	1179 E. 2100 South; 40°43′34″N 111°51′25″W	Sugar House	
99	Ivanhoe Apartments	Ivanhoe Apartments	October 20, 1989 (#89001738)	417 E. 300 South; 40°45′47″N 111°52′41″W	Central City	
100	Japanese Church of Christ	Japanese Church of Christ	August 17, 1982 (#82004144)	268 W. 100 South; 40°46′03″N 111°53′54″W	Downtown	
101	John W. Judd House	John W. Judd House	October 13, 1983 (#83003952)	918 E. Logan Ave. 40°44′03″N 111°51′50″W	Perkins Addition	
102	Judge Building	Judge Building	December 26, 1979 (#79002502)	8 E. 300 South; 40°45′46″N 111°53′24″W	Downtown	
103	Emanuel Kahn House	Emanuel Kahn House	July 21, 1977 (#77001309)	678 E. South Temple St. 40°46′09″N 111°52′15″W	Central City	Now the Anniversary Inn bed and breakfast
104	Karrick Block	Karrick Block	June 16, 1976 (#76001828)	236 S. Main St. 40°45′49″N 111°53′26″W	Downtown	
105	Kearns Building	Kearns Building	August 17, 1982 (#82004145)	132 S. Main St. 40°45′58″N 111°53′27″W	Downtown	
106	Thomas Kearns Mansion and Carriage House	Thomas Kearns Mansion and Carriage House	February 26, 1970 (#70000631)	603 E. South Temple St. 40°46′11″N 111°52′23″W	Avenues	Serves as the Utah Governor's Mansion
107	David Keith Mansion and Carriage House	David Keith Mansion and Carriage House	May 14, 1971 (#71000849)	529 E. South Temple St. 40°46′11″N 111°52′30″W	Avenues	
108	Keith-O'Brien Building	Keith-O'Brien Building	August 16, 1977 (#77001310)	242–256 S. Main St. 40°45′49″N 111°53′27″W	Downtown	
109	Albert H. Kelly House	Albert H. Kelly House	July 20, 1983 (#83004420)	418 S. 200 West; 40°45′36″N 111°53′49″W	Downtown	
110	John B. Kelly House	John B. Kelly House	July 20, 1983 (#83003172)	422 S. 200 West; 40°45′36″N 111°53′49″W	Downtown	
111	Keyser-Cullen House	Keyser-Cullen House	December 9, 1999 (#99001561)	941 E. 500 South; 40°45′32″N 111°51′48″W	Central City	
112	Malcolm and Elizabeth Keyser House	Malcolm and Elizabeth Keyser House	September 12, 2008 (#08000881)	381 E. 11th Ave. 40°46′57″N 111°52′41″W	Avenues	
113	Ladies Literary Club Clubhouse	Ladies Literary Club Clubhouse	October 11, 1978 (#78002675)	850 E. South Temple St. 40°46′10″N 111°51′58″W	Central City	
114	John C. and Mary Landenberger House	John C. and Mary Landenberger House	January 26, 2005 (#04001567)	58 N. Virginia St. 40°46′14″N 111°51′07″W	Federal Heights	
115	James and Susan R. Langton House	James and Susan R. Langton House	November 19, 1982 (#82001750)	648 E. 100 South; 40°46′01″N 111°52′19″W	Central City	
116	Harold B. and Fern Lee House	Harold B. and Fern Lee House	March 29, 2018 (#100002276)	1208 S. 900 West; 40°44′34″N 111°55′01″W	Glendale	
117	Lefler-Woodman Building	Lefler-Woodman Building	December 17, 1992 (#92001687)	859 E. 900 South; 40°45′00″N 111°51′55″W	9th and 9th	
118	Dr. David and Juanita Lewis House	Dr. David and Juanita Lewis House	November 29, 2001 (#01001283)	1403 E. Westminster Ave. 40°43′45″N 111°51′01″W	Sugar House	
119	Liberty Park	Liberty Park	December 11, 1980 (#80003926)	Roughly bounded by 500 East, 700 East, 900 South, and 1300 South; 40°44′45″N 111°52′26″W	Liberty Wells	
120	Liberty Wells Historic District	Liberty Wells Historic District	April 21, 2010 (#10000210)	Roughly bounded by 700 East, State St., 1300 South, and 2100 South; also bounded by State St., 900 South, 500 East, and 1300 South; 40°44′01″N 111°52′47″W	Liberty Wells	Originally listed as "Wells Historic District"; second set of boundaries represents the Liberty Wells Historic District boundary increase of January 27, 2012
121	Lincoln Arms Apartments	Lincoln Arms Apartments	October 20, 1989 (#89001737)	242 E. 100 South; 40°46′01″N 111°52′59″W	Central City	
122	Lollin Block	Lollin Block	August 18, 1977 (#77001311)	238 S. Main St. 40°45′51″N 111°53′27″W	Downtown	
123	Los Gables Apartments	Los Gables Apartments	March 5, 2021 (#100006232)	125 S. and 135 S. 300 East; 40°45′59″N 111°52′57″W	Central City	
124	Henry Luce House	Henry Luce House	October 13, 1983 (#83003953)	921 E. 1700 South; 40°44′01″N 111°51′50″W	Perkins Addition	
125	Walter C. Lyne House	Walter C. Lyne House	March 9, 1979 (#79003495)	1135 E. South Temple St. 40°46′11″N 111°51′28″W	Avenues	
126	Mabry-Van Pelt House	Mabry-Van Pelt House	October 13, 1983 (#83003954)	946 E. 1700 South; 40°44′00″N 111°51′47″W	Perkins Addition	
127	Millard F. Malin House	Millard F. Malin House	July 7, 1983 (#83003173)	233 S. 400 East; 40°45′51″N 111°52′45″W	Central City	
128	James G. McAllister House	James G. McAllister House	December 17, 1982 (#82001751)	306 Douglas St. 40°45′45″N 111°51′17″W	University	
129	McCornick Building	McCornick Building	August 24, 1977 (#77001312)	10 W. 100 South; 40°46′03″N 111°53′26″W	Downtown	
130	Alfred W. McCune Mansion	Alfred W. McCune Mansion	June 13, 1974 (#74001937)	200 N. Main St. 40°46′26″N 111°53′24″W	Capitol Hill	
131	J. G. McDonald Chocolate Company Building	J. G. McDonald Chocolate Company Building	March 29, 1978 (#78002676)	155–159 W. 300 South; 40°45′45″N 111°53′44″W	Downtown	
132	McIntyre Building	McIntyre Building	July 15, 1977 (#77001313)	68–72 S. Main St. 40°46′04″N 111°53′26″W	Downtown	
133	McIntyre House	McIntyre House	July 17, 1978 (#78002677)	259 7th Ave. 40°46′39″N 111°52′54″W	Avenues	
134	Joseph and Marie N. McRae House	Joseph and Marie N. McRae House	December 20, 2002 (#02001555)	452 E. 500 South; 40°45′30″N 111°52′38″W	Central City	
135	Mexican Branch LDS Meetinghouse	Mexican Branch LDS Meetinghouse	July 5, 2022 (#100007106)	232 W. 800 South; 40°45′07″N 111°53′52″W	Central City West	
136	Frederick A.E. Meyer House	Frederick A.E. Meyer House	July 7, 1983 (#83003174)	929 E. 200 South; 40°45′55″N 111°51′49″W	Central City	
137	Alexander Mitchell House	Alexander Mitchell House	October 13, 1983 (#83003955)	1620 S. 1000 East; 40°44′03″N 111°51′43″W	Perkins Addition	
138	Richard Vaughen Morris House	Richard Vaughen Morris House	April 29, 1980 (#80003929)	314 Quince St. 40°46′34″N 111°53′40″W	Capitol Hill	
139	Morrison-Merrill Lumber Company Office and Warehouse	Morrison-Merrill Lumber Company Office and Warehouse	December 17, 1998 (#98001534)	205 N. 400 West; 40°46′26″N 111°54′07″W	Capitol Hill	
140	Mountain States Telephone and Telegraph Co. Garage	Mountain States Telephone and Telegraph Co. Garage	November 24, 1998 (#98000827)	1075 E. Hollywood Ave. 40°43′39″N 111°51′36″W	Sugar House	
141	William A. Nelden House	William A. Nelden House	October 19, 1978 (#78002678)	1172 E. 100 South; 40°46′01″N 111°51′23″W	University	
142	Harlan and Marie Nelson House	Harlan and Marie Nelson House	January 4, 2021 (#100006014)	2785 E. Lancaster Dr. 40°44′15″N 111°48′39″W	East Bench	
143	Nelson-Beesley House	Nelson-Beesley House	June 20, 1980 (#80003931)	533 11th Ave. 40°46′56″N 111°52′22″W	Avenues	
144	Carl M. Neuhausen House	Carl M. Neuhausen House	October 3, 1980 (#80003932)	1265 E. 100 South; 40°46′04″N 111°51′15″W	University	
145	New York Hotel	New York Hotel	March 10, 1980 (#80003933)	42 Post Office Pl. 40°45′42″N 111°53′31″W	Downtown	
146	Old Clock at Zion's First National Bank	Old Clock at Zion's First National Bank	December 27, 1982 (#82001752)	Southwestern corner of 100 South and Main St. 40°46′01″N 111°53′27″W	Downtown	
147	Old Pioneer Fort Site	Old Pioneer Fort Site	October 15, 1974 (#74001938)	400 South and 200 West; 40°45′43″N 111°54′01″W	Downtown	
148	Oquirrh School	Oquirrh School	December 4, 2008 (#08001156)	350 S. 400 East; 40°45′41″N 111°52′50″W	Central City	
149	Oregon Shortline Railroad Company Building	Oregon Shortline Railroad Company Building	June 23, 1976 (#76001829)	126–140 Pierpont Ave. 40°45′51″N 111°53′39″W	Downtown	
150	Frank M. Orem House	Frank M. Orem House	August 5, 1983 (#83003175)	274 S. 1200 East; 40°45′48″N 111°51′24″W	University	
151	Orpheum Theatre	Orpheum Theatre	September 30, 1976 (#76002257)	46 W. 200 South; 40°45′55″N 111°53′32″W	Downtown	
152	Ottinger Hall	Ottinger Hall	April 16, 1971 (#71000851)	233 Canyon Rd. 40°46′32″N 111°53′07″W	City Creek Canyon	
153	Pacific Northwest Pipeline Building	Pacific Northwest Pipeline Building	January 24, 2011 (#10001159)	315 E. 200 South; 40°45′56″N 111°52′54″W	Central City	Built in 1958 in International Style, it was the Salt Lake City Public Safety Building from 1979 to 2013.
154	Palace Apartments	Palace Apartments	July 12, 2021 (#100006717)	145 S. 300 East; 40°45′58″N 111°52′57″W	Central City	
155	Lowell and Emily Parrish House	Lowell and Emily Parrish House	October 19, 2018 (#100003044)	701 N. I St. 40°47′07″N 111°52′18″W	Avenues	
156	Peter Pan Apartments	Peter Pan Apartments	September 12, 2008 (#08000880)	445 E. 300 South; 40°45′45″N 111°52′41″W	Central City	
157	Park Hotel	Park Hotel	December 17, 1992 (#92001690)	422–432 W. 300 South; 40°45′47″N 111°54′10″W	Central City West	
158	Clifford R. Pearsall House	Clifford R. Pearsall House	October 13, 1983 (#83003957)	950 E. Logan Ave. 40°44′03″N 111°51′46″W	Perkins Addition	
159	Piccardy Apartments	Piccardy Apartments	September 12, 2008 (#08000879)	115 S. 300 East; 40°46′00″N 111°52′56″W	Central City	
160	Peery Hotel	Peery Hotel	February 17, 1978 (#78002679)	270–280 S. West Temple, 102–120 W. 300 South; 40°45′47″N 111°53′36″W	Downtown	
161	John Platts House	John Platts House	August 25, 1972 (#72001259)	364 Quince St. 40°46′40″N 111°53′39″W	Capitol Hill	
162	John and Margaret Price House	John and Margaret Price House	January 7, 2015 (#14001140)	2691 E. St. Mary's Way; 40°44′34″N 111°48′49″W	Foothill	
163	Lorenzo and Emma Price House and Barn	Lorenzo and Emma Price House and Barn	August 6, 1998 (#98001016)	1205 E. 1300 South; 40°44′31″N 111°51′20″W	East Central	
164	Lewis A. Ramsey House	Lewis A. Ramsey House	May 28, 1999 (#99000621)	128 S. 1000 East; 40°45′59″N 111°51′44″W	Central City	
165	Richardson-Bower Building	Richardson-Bower Building	July 11, 2003 (#03000636)	1019 E. 2100 South; 40°43′32″N 111°51′41″W	Sugar House	
166	Edward and Harriet Rosenbaum House	Edward and Harriet Rosenbaum House	April 7, 2020 (#100005175)	1428 E. Circle Way; 40°46′22″N 111°50′49″W	Federal Heights	
167	Rowland Hall-St. Mark's School	Rowland Hall-St. Mark's School	July 26, 1979 (#79002504)	205 1st Ave. 40°46′17″N 111°52′55″W	Avenues	Now the Madeleine Choir School
168	Jonathan C. and Eliza K. Royle House	Jonathan C. and Eliza K. Royle House	January 3, 1983 (#83003176)	635 E. 100 South; 40°46′03″N 111°52′21″W	Central City	
169	Eliza Gray Rumel House	Eliza Gray Rumel House	July 7, 1983 (#83003177)	358 S. 500 East; 40°45′41″N 111°52′35″W	Central City	
170	St. Mark's Episcopal Cathedral	St. Mark's Episcopal Cathedral	September 22, 1970 (#70000630)	231 E. 100 South; 40°46′04″N 111°53′00″W	Central City	
171	Salt Lake City 15th Ward LDS Meetinghouse	Salt Lake City 15th Ward LDS Meetinghouse	March 16, 2023 (#100008752)	915 West 100 South; 40°46′01″N 111°55′03″W	Poplar Grove	
172	Salt Lake City and County Building	Salt Lake City and County Building	June 15, 1970 (#70000629)	451 Washington Sq. 40°45′35″N 111°53′09″W	Central City	
173	Salt Lake City East Side Historic District	Salt Lake City East Side Historic District	August 22, 1996 (#96000940)	Roughly bounded by South Temple, 1100 East, 400 South, University Ave., 900 South, and 500 East; 40°45′31″N 111°52′05″W	Central City	Originally the Central City Historic District, a two-block wide strip from South Temple to 900 South; boundaries greatly increased in 2001 and 2003, the last of which included a name change
174	Salt Lake City Public Library	Salt Lake City Public Library	August 7, 1979 (#79002505)	15 S. State St. 40°46′07″N 111°53′13″W	Downtown	Housed the Hansen Planetarium 1965–2003, O.C. Tanner Jewelry since 2009
175	Salt Lake Country Club and Golf Course	Salt Lake Country Club and Golf Course	July 7, 2015 (#15000400)	2375 S. 900 East; 40°43′07″N 111°51′55″W	Sugar House	
176	Salt Lake Engineering Works-Bogue Supply Company Building	Salt Lake Engineering Works-Bogue Supply Company Building	August 14, 2003 (#03000156)	741 W. 400 South; 40°45′37″N 111°54′46″W	Central City West	
177	Salt Lake Hardware Company Warehouse	Salt Lake Hardware Company Warehouse	October 4, 2001 (#01001082)	155 N. 400 West; 40°46′19″N 111°54′09″W	Capitol Hill	
178	Salt Lake Northwest Historic District	Salt Lake Northwest Historic District	March 29, 2001 (#01000320)	Roughly bounded by 1100 West, 600 North, 500 West, and North Temple; 40°46′48″N 111°54′58″W	Fairpark	
179	Salt Lake Stamp Company Building	Salt Lake Stamp Company Building	December 27, 1982 (#82001753)	380 W. 200 South; 40°45′55″N 111°54′08″W	Central City West	
180	Salt Lake Stock and Mining Exchange Building	Salt Lake Stock and Mining Exchange Building	July 30, 1976 (#76001830)	39 Exchange Place; 40°45′42″N 111°53′21″W	Downtown	
181	Salt Lake Union Pacific Railroad Station	Salt Lake Union Pacific Railroad Station	July 9, 1975 (#75001818)	South Temple at 400 West; 40°46′10″N 111°54′09″W	Central City West	
182	Sampson Apartments	Sampson Apartments	January 27, 2010 (#09001292)	276 E. 300 South; 40°45′46″N 111°53′00″W	Central City	
183	Sarah Daft Home for the Aged	Sarah Daft Home for the Aged	September 12, 2002 (#02001041)	737 S. 1300 East; 40°45′11″N 111°51′12″W	Central City	
184	Seventh-day Adventist Meetinghouse and School	Seventh-day Adventist Meetinghouse and School	February 6, 2007 (#06000930)	1840 S. 800 East; 40°43′47″N 111°52′04″W	Sugar House	
185	Silver Brothers' Iron Works Office and Warehouse	Silver Brothers' Iron Works Office and Warehouse	May 20, 1999 (#99000622)	550 W. 700 South; 40°45′16″N 111°54′20″W	Central City West	
186	Smith Apartments	Smith Apartments	October 20, 1989 (#89001740)	228 S. 300 East; 40°45′51″N 111°52′58″W	Central City	
187	George Albert Smith House	George Albert Smith House	March 12, 1993 (#93000066)	1302 E. Yale Ave. 40°44′44″N 111°51′11″W	Yalecrest	
188	Smith-Bailey Drug Company Building	Smith-Bailey Drug Company Building	August 17, 1982 (#82004146)	171 W. 200 South; 40°45′53″N 111°53′45″W	Downtown	
189	South Temple Historic District	South Temple Historic District	July 14, 1982 (#82004147)	100 E. to 1350 E. South Temple St. 40°46′10″N 111°52′11″W	Central City	
190	Sprague Branch of the Salt Lake City Public Library	Sprague Branch of the Salt Lake City Public Library	July 11, 2003 (#03000637)	2131 S. Highland Dr. 40°43′30″N 111°51′30″W	Sugar House	
191	Steiner American Building	Steiner American Building	September 19, 2019 (#100004393)	505 E. South Temple; 40°46′10″N 111°52′35″W	Downtown	
192	Stratford Hotel	Stratford Hotel	December 27, 1982 (#82001754)	175 E. 200 South; 40°45′55″N 111°53′06″W	Central City	
193	Sugar House LDS Ward Building	Sugar House LDS Ward Building	July 11, 2003 (#03000631)	1950 S. 1200 East; 40°43′40″N 111°51′24″W	Sugar House	
194	Sugar House Monument	Sugar House Monument	July 11, 2003 (#03000638)	1100 East and 2100 South; 40°43′32″N 111°51′34″W	Sugar House	
195	Sweet Candy Company Building	Sweet Candy Company Building	December 28, 2000 (#00001584)	224 S. 200 West; 40°45′52″N 111°53′48″W	Downtown	
196	Symphony Hall	Symphony Hall	November 6, 2024 (#100011033)	123 W. South Temple; 40°46′08″N 111°53′43″W	Downtown	Now known as Abravanel Hall.
197	Temple Square	Temple Square	October 15, 1966 (#66000738)	Temple Square; 40°46′14″N 111°53′29″W	Downtown	
198	Tenth East Senior Center	Tenth East Senior Center	July 27, 2026 (#100013254)	237-239 South 1000 East; 40°45′50″N 111°51′45″W	East Central	
199	Tenth Ward Square	Tenth Ward Square	November 11, 1977 (#77001314)	400 South and 800 East; 40°45′37″N 111°52′05″W	Central City	
200	Third Presbyterian Church Parsonage	Third Presbyterian Church Parsonage	May 19, 2000 (#00000522)	1068 E. Blaine Ave. 40°43′56″N 111°51′35″W	Sugar House	
201	Tracy Loan and Trust Company Building	Tracy Loan and Trust Company Building	October 10, 1978 (#78002681)	151 S. Main St. 40°45′57″N 111°53′24″W	Downtown	
202	Tribune Building	Tribune Building	July 30, 2012 (#82005108)	137 S. Main St. 40°45′58″N 111°53′27″W	Downtown	
203	Trinity A.M.E. Church	Trinity A.M.E. Church	July 30, 1976 (#76001831)	239 E. 600 South; 40°45′24″N 111°53′01″W	Central City	
204	Twenty-Ninth Ward LDS Meetinghouse	Twenty-Ninth Ward LDS Meetinghouse	April 6, 2015 (#15000132)	1102 W. 400 North; 40°46′42″N 111°55′23″W	Fairpark	
205	Frank M. and Susan E. Ulmer House	Frank M. and Susan E. Ulmer House	December 20, 2002 (#02001556)	1458 S. 1300 East; 40°44′16″N 111°51′12″W	Sugar House	
206	University Neighborhood Historic District	University Neighborhood Historic District	December 13, 1995 (#95001430)	Roughly bounded by 500 South, South Temple, 1100 East and University St. 40°45′50″N 111°51′20″W	University	
207	University of Utah Circle	University of Utah Circle	April 20, 1978 (#78002682)	University of Utah campus 40°45′54″N 111°50′59″W	University	
208	US Post Office-Sugar House	US Post Office-Sugar House	February 18, 1994 (#93000409)	2155 S. Highland Dr. 40°43′27″N 111°51′30″W	Sugar House	
209	Utah Commercial and Savings Bank Building	Utah Commercial and Savings Bank Building	June 18, 1975 (#75001819)	22 E. 100 South; 40°46′01″N 111°53′23″W	Downtown	
210	Utah State Fair Grounds	Utah State Fair Grounds	January 27, 1981 (#81000583)	1000 West and North Temple Sts. 40°46′30″N 111°55′30″W	Fairpark	
211	Utah State Liquor Agency No. 22	Utah State Liquor Agency No. 22	July 11, 2003 (#03000639)	1983 S. 1100 East; 40°43′37″N 111°51′34″W	Sugar House	demolished
212	Veterans Administration Hospital	Veterans Administration Hospital	June 16, 1996 (#96000630)	401 E. 12th Ave. 40°47′03″N 111°52′39″W	Avenues	
213	Walker Bank Building	Walker Bank Building	October 4, 2006 (#06000929)	175 S. Main St. 40°45′55″N 111°53′24″W	Downtown	
214	Warehouse District	Warehouse District	August 17, 1982 (#82004149)	200 South and Pierpont Ave. between 300 and 400 West; also oughly bounded by I-15, US 50 S., W. Temple St., 300 West & 1000 South; 40°45′47″N 111°54′10″W	Central City West	Second set of addresses represent a boundary increase of March 22, 2016
215	Wasatch Springs Plunge	Wasatch Springs Plunge	May 15, 1980 (#80003936)	840 N. 300 West; 40°47′21″N 111°53′57″W	Capitol Hill	Housed the Children's Museum of Utah 1983–2006
216	Charles H. Weeks House	Charles H. Weeks House	October 13, 1983 (#83003959)	935 E. Logan Ave. 40°44′04″N 111°51′48″W	Perkins Addition	
217	Western General Agency Building	Western General Agency Building	September 29, 2015 (#15000678)	780 E. South Temple St. 40°46′09″N 111°52′08″W	East Central	
218	Western Macaroni Manufacturing Company Factory	Western Macaroni Manufacturing Company Factory	April 7, 2015 (#15000133)	244 S. 500 West; 40°45′49″N 111°54′24″W	Central City West	
219	Westminster College President's House	Westminster College President's House	September 7, 2001 (#01000961)	1733 S. 1300 East; 40°43′59″N 111°51′09″W	Sugar House	
220	Westmoreland Place Historic District	Westmoreland Place Historic District	April 27, 2011 (#11000234)	Roughly bounded by 1300 South, 1500 East, Sherman Ave. & 1600 East Sts. 40°44′27″N 111°50′48″W	Foothill	
221	Nelson Wheeler Whipple House	Nelson Wheeler Whipple House	September 26, 1979 (#79002506)	564 W. 400 North; 40°46′42″N 111°54′27″W	Fairpark	
222	John M. Whitaker House	John M. Whitaker House	March 30, 1978 (#78002684)	975 Garfield Ave. 40°43′48″N 111°51′43″W	Sugar House	
223	Woodruff Villa	Woodruff Villa	July 14, 1982 (#82004150)	1622 S. 500 East; 40°44′03″N 111°52′34″W	Liberty Wells	
224	Asahel Hart Woodruff House	Asahel Hart Woodruff House	July 14, 1982 (#82004151)	1636 S. 500 East; 40°44′02″N 111°52′34″W	Liberty Wells	
225	Wilford Woodruff Farm House	Wilford Woodruff Farm House	July 14, 1982 (#82004152)	1604 S. 500 East; 40°44′04″N 111°52′34″W	Liberty Wells	
226	Woodruff-Riter House	Woodruff-Riter House	July 26, 1979 (#79002507)	225 N. State St. 40°46′27″N 111°53′16″W	Capitol Hill	
227	Yalecrest Historic District	Yalecrest Historic District	November 8, 2007 (#07001168)	Roughly bounded by Sunnyside Ave. (840 South) to 1300 South, and 1300 East to 1800 East; 40°44′48″N 111°50′43″W	Yalecrest	
228	Thomas Yardley House	Thomas Yardley House	October 13, 1983 (#83003961)	955 E. Logan Ave. 40°44′04″N 111°51′45″W	Perkins Addition	
229	Brigham Young Complex	Brigham Young Complex	October 15, 1966 (#66000739)	63–67 E. South Temple St. 40°46′11″N 111°53′17″W	Downtown	
230	Z.C.M.I. Cast Iron Front	Z.C.M.I. Cast Iron Front	September 22, 1970 (#70000632)	15 S. Main St. 40°46′08″N 111°53′24″W	Downtown	Now part of the façade of City Creek Center
231	ZCMI General Warehouse	ZCMI General Warehouse	December 28, 2005 (#05001487)	230 S. 500 West; 40°45′52″N 111°54′19″W	Central City West	

== Former listings ==
	Name on the Register	Image	Date listed	Date removed	Location	Neighborhood	Description
1	Amussen's Jewelry	Amussen's Jewelry	June 3, 1976 (#76001821)	April 17, 1986	62 S. Main St.	Downtown	All but the front facade was demolished in 1979 for construction of the Crossroads Plaza Mall.
2	Brigham Young Forest Farmhouse	Brigham Young Forest Farmhouse	May 14, 1971 (#71000852)	May 29, 1975	732 Ashton Ave.(Original location. Now located at:); 40°45′12″N 111°49′14″W	Sugar House	Delisted in 1975 when it was relocated to This Is the Place Heritage Park.
3	Brooks Arcade	Brooks Arcade	August 17, 1982 (#82004133)	July 3, 2014	260 S. State St. 40°45′51″N 111°53′17″W	Downtown	Largely demolished save the facade in 2001.
4	Building at 592–98 West 200 South		August 17, 1982 (#82004134)	September 3, 2009	592-98 W. 200 South	Central City West	
5	Carlson Hall	Carlson Hall	April 12, 1996 (#96000414)	June 15, 2015	369 S. University St. 40°45′41″N 111°51′04″W	University	Part of the University of Utah's S.J. Quinney College of Law. Demolished in 2013.
6	Clayton Building		June 17, 1982 (#82004138)	December 28, 1994	214 S. State St.	Downtown	Demolished in 1991.
7	Constitution Building		September 29, 1976 (#86003018)	April 17, 1986	34 S. Main St.	Downtown	Demolished in June, 1976.
8	Federal Reserve Bank	Federal Reserve Bank	August 17, 1982 (#100002902)	April 17, 1986	70 E. South Temple; 40°46′09″N 111°53′19″W	Downtown	Demolished in 1984.
9	Ferry Hall		October 13, 1983 (#83003951)	March 8, 1988	1840 S. 1300 East	Sugar House	Demolished in June, 1987.
10	Granite Lumber Company Building		July 11, 2003 (#03000629)	June 15, 2015	1090 E. 2100 South; 40°43′31″N 111°51′33″W	Sugar House	
11	Hotel Albert	Hotel Albert	August 17, 1982 (#82004142)	January 17, 2017	123 S. West Temple St. 40°46′00″N 111°53′35″W	Downtown	
12	LDS First Ward Meetinghouse		April 30, 1976 (#76002258)	November 25, 1976	760 S. 800 East	Central City	
13	Pantages Theatre		January 7, 2022 (#100007291)	August 15, 2023	144 South Main St.		The theater was determined eligible for NRHP listing in 2022 but the owner objected. It was delisted in 2023 after its demolition.
14	Redman Van and Storage Company Building	Redman Van and Storage Company Building	July 11, 2003 (#03000635)	February 11, 2007	1240 E. 2100 South	Sugar House	Delisted due to significant alterations in 2005.
15	Shubrick Hotel		August 17, 1982 (#82005107)	August 15, 2023	68 West Four Hundred South		The hotel was determined eligible for NRHP listing in 1982, but the owner objected to the listing. It was delisted in 2023.
16	Albert Smith House		July 7, 1983 (#83003178)	December 28, 1994	349 S. 200 West	Downtown	
17	Tampico Restaurant		December 27, 1982 (#82001755)	February 1, 1995	169 Regent St. 40°45′55″N 111°53′20″W	Downtown	
18	Technical High School	Technical High School	February 19, 1980 (#80003934)	May 15, 2001	241 N. 300 West; 40°46′30″N 111°54′07″W	Capitol Hill	
19	Utah Savings And Trust Company Building		May 22, 1978 (#78002683)	December 4, 1991	235 S. Main St.	Downtown	Demolished in April 1991.
20	Utah Slaughter Company Warehouse		August 17, 1982 (#82004148)	June 15, 2015	370 W. 100 South; 40°46′03″N 111°54′05″W	Central City West	No longer here; the Delta Center stands on this property

== See also ==
- List of National Historic Landmarks in Utah
- National Register of Historic Places listings in Utah
