= Tenth Ward =

Tenth Ward may refer to:

- 10th Ward of New Orleans, a ward of New Orleans
- Tenth Ward Square, a historic district in Salt Lake City
- 10th ward, Chicago, an aldermanic ward in Chicago
- Ward 10, St. Louis City, an aldermanic ward of St. Louis
- Ward 10, the name of several wards of Zimbabwe
- Gloucester-Southgate Ward, Ottawa (also known as Ward 10)
