= J. A. Fritsch Block =

Historic building in Salt Lake City, Utah, U.S.

- U.S. National Register of Historic Places
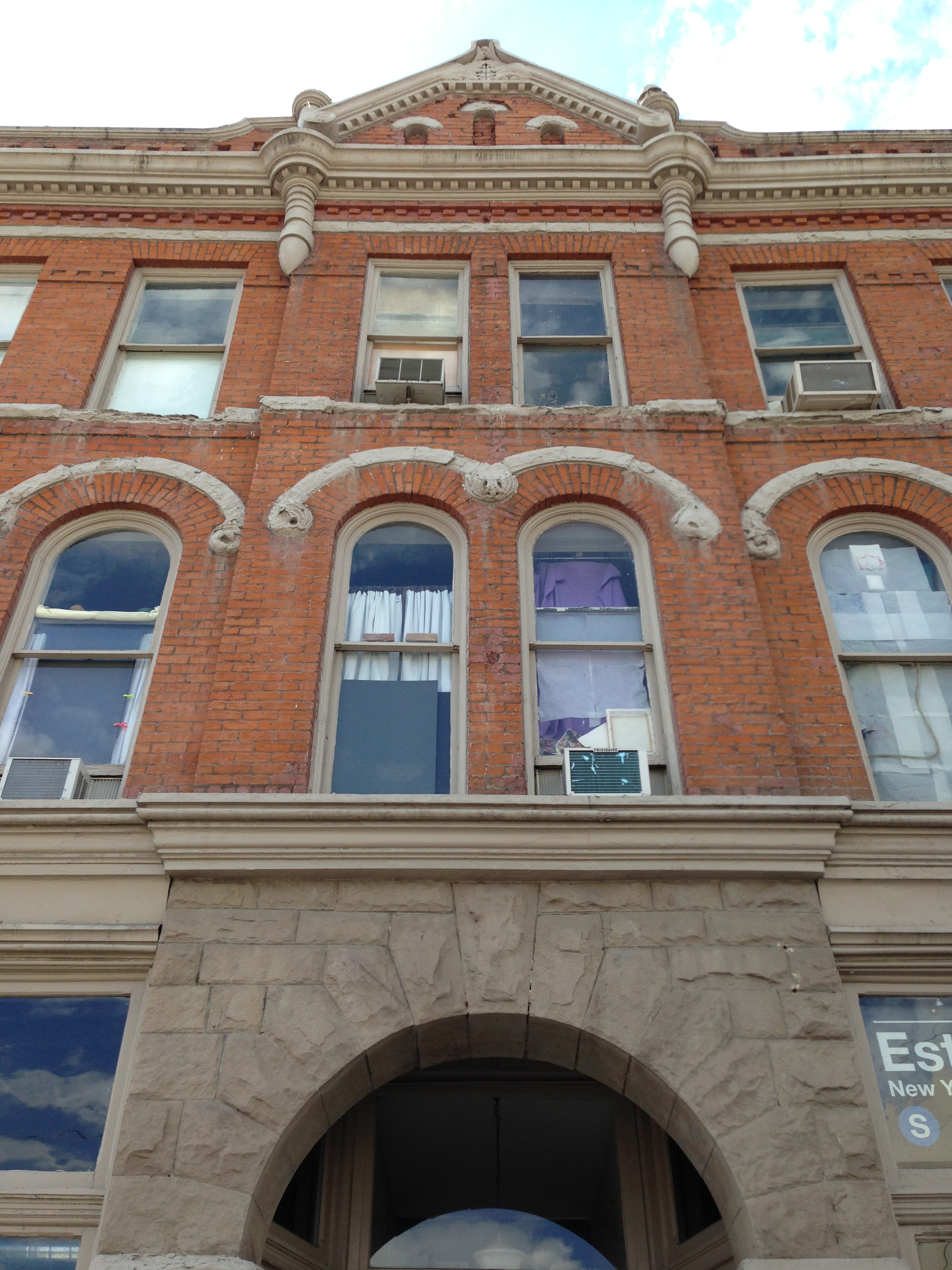
- The building in 2013

- Location within Utah Location within the United States
- Location: 158 E. 200 South, Salt Lake City, Utah
- Coordinates: 40°45′53″N 111°53′07″W
- Area: less than one acre
- Built: 1890
- Architect: Carroll & Kern
- Architectural style: Richardsonian Romanesque
- NRHP reference No.: 76001826
- Added to NRHP: July 30, 1976

The J. A. Fritsch Block is a historic three-story building in Salt Lake City, Utah. It was built in 1890 for the Fritsch Investment Company, co-founded by Francis Fritsch, an immigrant from Germany, and his son John. It was designed in the Richardsonian Romanesque style by Carroll & Kern. The second and third floor were used as hotel rooms, first known as the Worth Hotel and later as the Granite Hotel. The building was purchased by Lorus Manwaring, Sr., the owner of a bicycle store, in 1931–1932. It has been listed on the National Register of Historic Places since July 30, 1976.
