= Corona Apartments =

Historic building in Salt Lake City, Utah, U.S.

- U.S. National Register of Historic Places
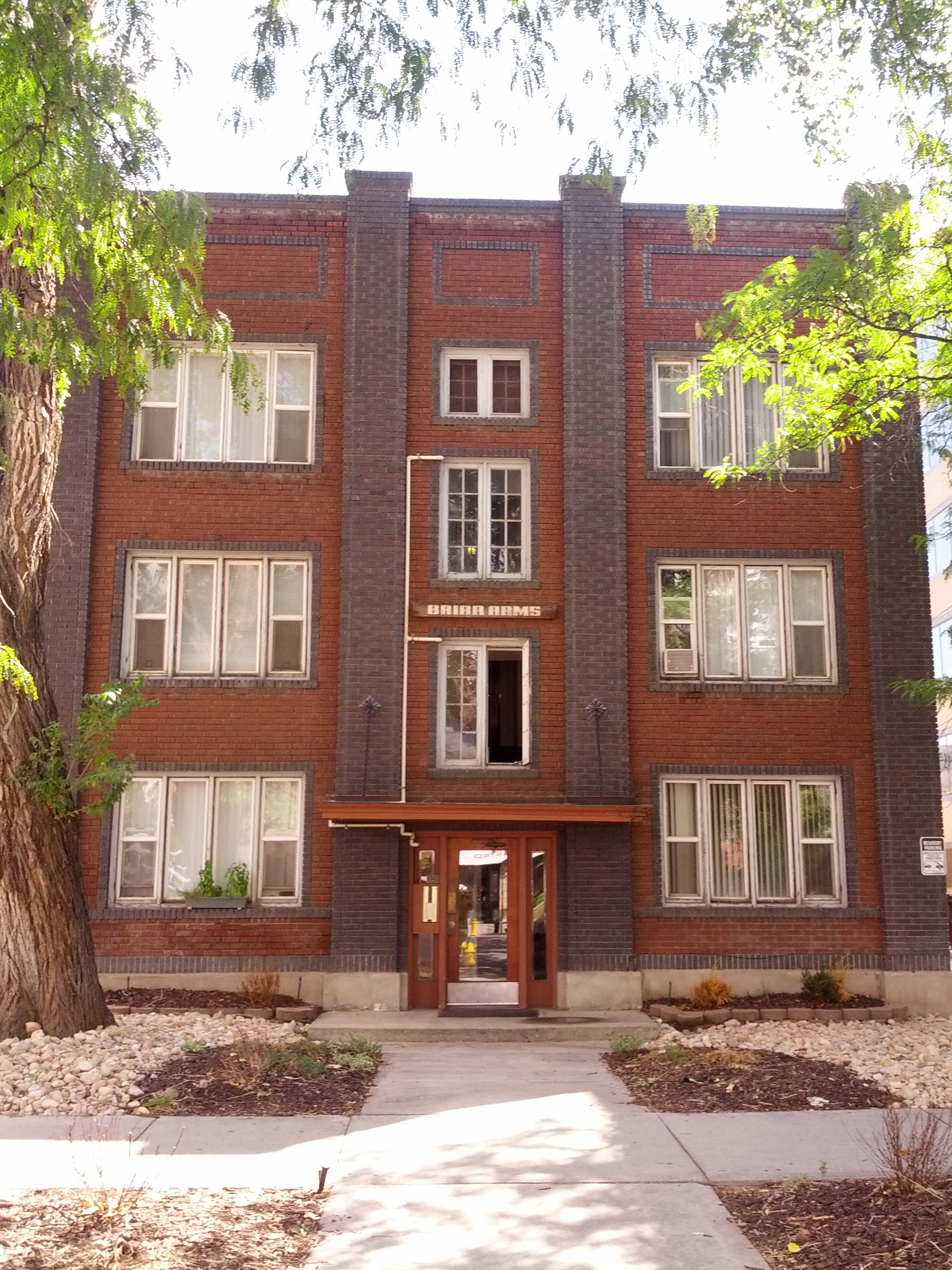
- The building in 2013

- Location within Utah Location within the United States
- Location: 335 South 200 East, Salt Lake City, Utah
- Coordinates: 40°45′43″N 111°53′03″W
- Area: less than one acre
- Built: 1925
- Built by: Bowers Building Company
- Architectural style: Prairie School
- MPS: Salt Lake City MPS
- NRHP reference No.: 89001742
- Added to NRHP: October 20, 1989

Corona Apartments is a historic three-story building in Salt Lake City, Utah. It was built by the Bowers Building Company in 1925, and designed in the Prairie School style. It has been listed on the National Register of Historic Places since October 20, 1989.
