= Ivanhoe Apartments =

Historic building in Salt Lake City, Utah, U.S.

- U.S. National Register of Historic Places
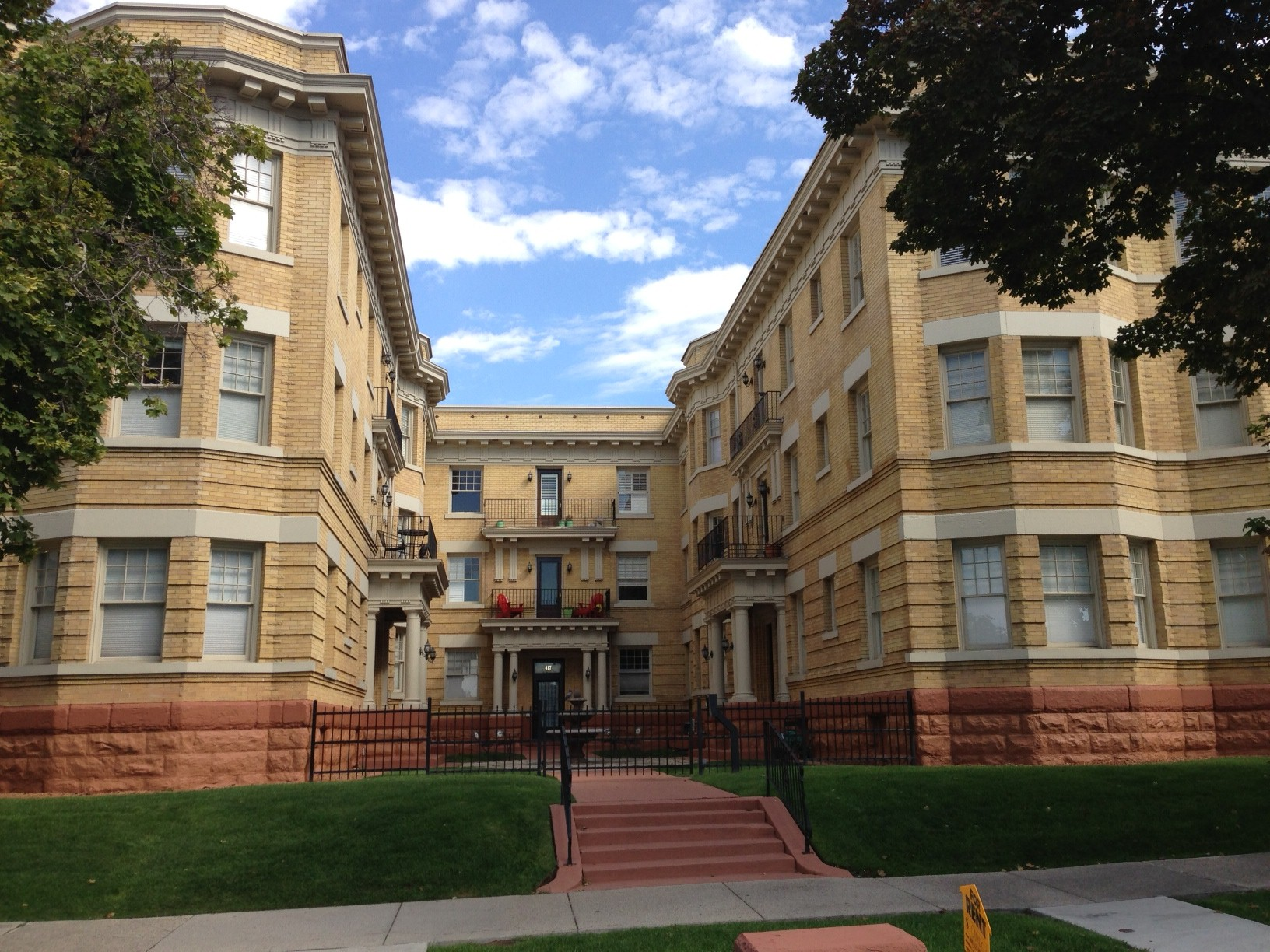
- The apartment complex in 2013

- Location within Utah Location within the United States
- Location: 417 E. 300 South, Salt Lake City, Utah
- Coordinates: 40°45′47″N 111°52′41″W
- Area: less than one acre
- Built: 1908
- Architect: Bernard O. Mecklenburg
- Architectural style: Colonial Revival, Classical Revival
- MPS: Salt Lake City MPS
- NRHP reference No.: 89001738
- Added to NRHP: October 20, 1989

Ivanhoe Apartments is a historic three-story building in Salt Lake City, Utah. It was built as a U-shaped residential building in 1908 for Finch, Rogers and Mulvey, an investment firm co-founded by Harry L. Finch, Richard E. Rogers and Martin E. Mulvey. Their company later became known as the Ivanhoe Investment Company. The building was purchased by Jedd L. and Mary E. Hansen in 1943. It was designed in the Colonial Revival and Classical Revival styles. It has been listed on the National Register of Historic Places since October 20, 1989.

It is a U-shaped three-story brick building with a parapet roof, upon a sandstone foundation. It has three units on each floor, one at back and one on each side, around a courtyard in the center. Its Neo-Classical and/or Colonial Revival features including a stamped metal cornice with block modillions, classical porticoes at the entrances, bay windows, and horizontal brick banding on the first floor which is asserted to create a quoin-like effect.
