= Lincoln Arms Apartments =

Historic building in Salt Lake City, Utah, U.S.

- U.S. National Register of Historic Places
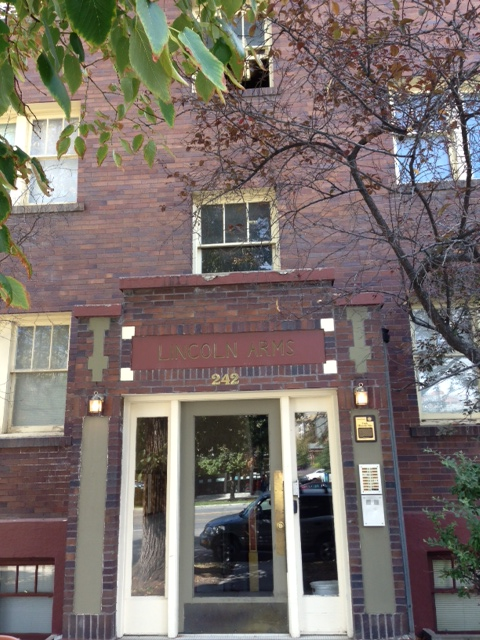
- The building in 2013

- Location within Utah Location within the United States
- Location: 242 East 100 South, Salt Lake City, Utah
- Coordinates: 40°46′01″N 111°52′59″W
- Area: less than one acre
- Built: 1924
- Built by: Phillip T. Bratt
- MPS: Salt Lake City MPS
- NRHP reference No.: 89001737
- Added to NRHP: October 20, 1989

Lincoln Arms Apartments is a historic three-story building in Salt Lake City, Utah. It was built in 1924–1925 by Phillip T. Bratt, who owned the building with his wife N. Myrtle Bratt until 1926, when they sold it to Katie R. Stevens. It was later owned by J.B. Arnovitz and James L. White (1931–32), followed by J.H. and Elizabeth Angel. It has been listed on the National Register of Historic Places since October 20, 1989.
