= William Hawk Cabin =

Historic building in Salt Lake City, Utah, U.S.

- U.S. National Register of Historic Places
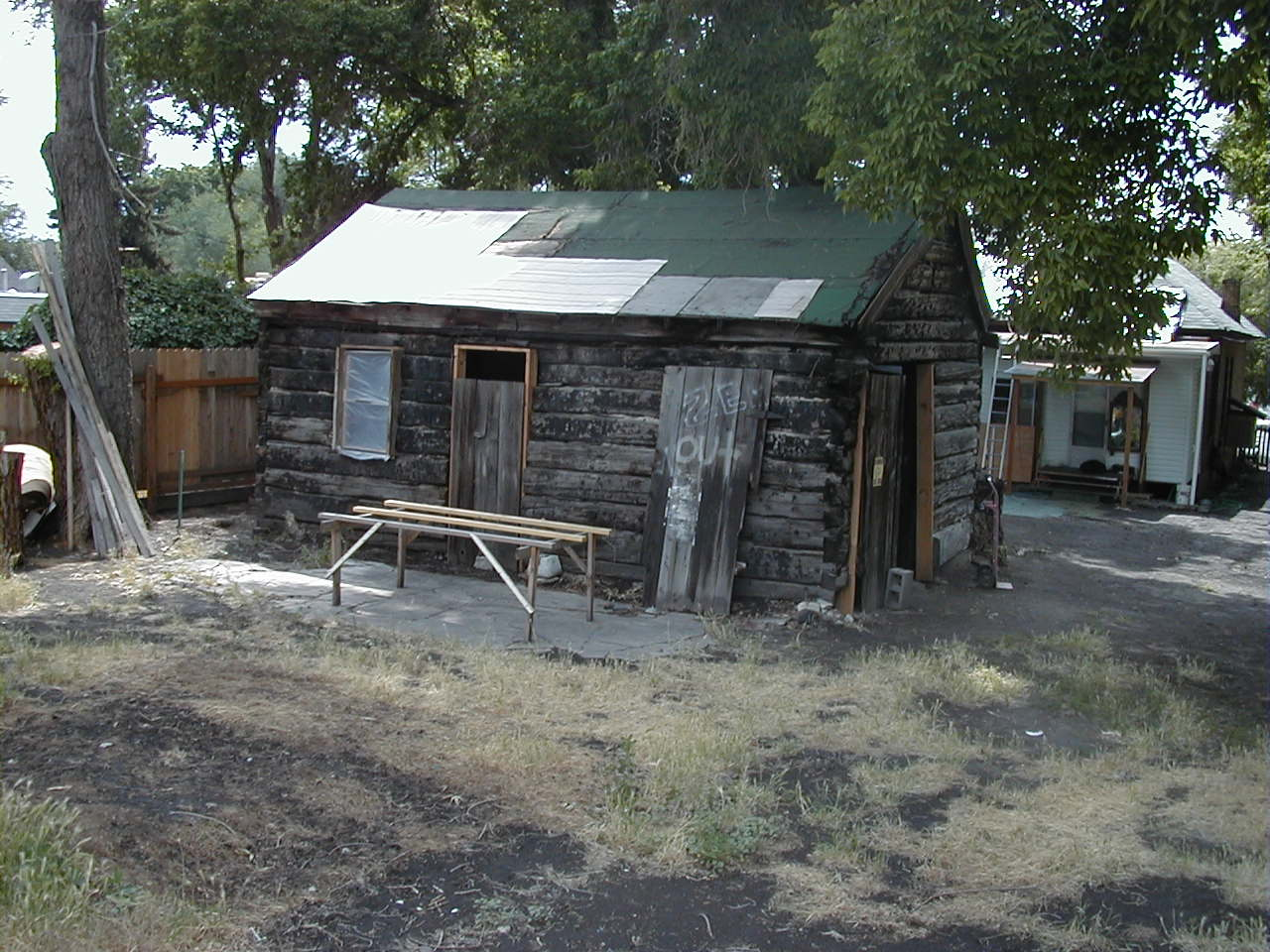

- Location within Utah Location within the United States
- Location: 458 N. 3rd West, Salt Lake City, Utah
- Coordinates: 40°46′54″N 111°53′53″W
- Area: less than one acre
- Built: c.1850
- Architectural style: Pennsylvania style log cabin
- NRHP reference No.: 78002671
- Added to NRHP: December 29, 1978

The William Hawk Cabin at 458 North 3rd West, Salt Lake City, Utah, United States, is a "Pennsylvania style" log cabin that was built between 1848 and 1852.

== Description ==
The cabin is significant primarily for its association with William Hawk, whose home it was from 1852 until his death in 1883. William Hawk had extraordinary moments in his life; for one instance he was sent by Mormon Samuel Brannan to carry news from California to Independence, Missouri, via Salt Lake City, that gold had been found at Sutter's Creek.

The cabin was listed on the National Register of Historic Places in 1978.

The Hawk cabin was moved some 100 feet (30 m) in a west/north-west direction, in order to place it closer to the original location, and restoration begun in June 2017. Interior restoration was completed in February, 2019.

== See also ==
- National Register of Historic Places listings in Salt Lake City
