= Bigelow Apartments =

Historic building in Salt Lake City, Utah, U.S.

- U.S. National Register of Historic Places
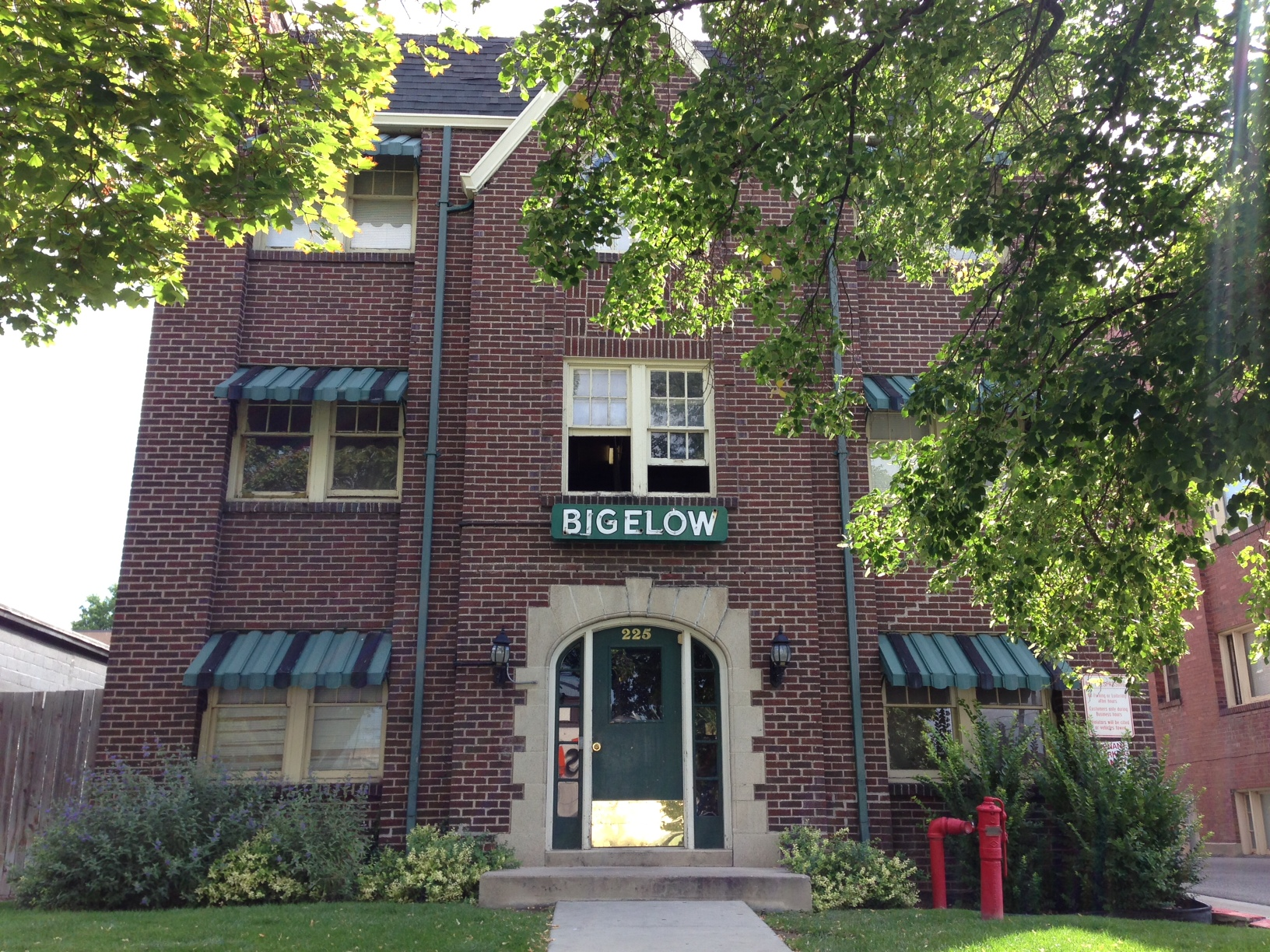
- The building in 2013

- Location within Utah Location within the United States
- Location: 225 South 400 East, Salt Lake City, Utah
- Coordinates: 40°45′50″N 111°52′43″W
- Area: less than one acre
- Built: 1930
- Architect: Archrlaus Fillingame
- Architectural style: Exotic Revival
- MPS: Salt Lake City MPS
- NRHP reference No.: 04001418
- Added to NRHP: December 30, 2004

Bigelow Apartments is a historic three-story building in Salt Lake City, Utah. It was built in 1930-1931 by Archelaus Fillingame, and designed in the Exotic Revival style. Fillingame was the developer, architect, builder and owner of the building, which remained in the Fillingame family until 1948. It has been listed on the National Register of Historic Places since December 30, 2004.
