= Lefler-Woodman Building =

Historic building in Salt Lake City, Utah, U.S.

- Lefler--Woodman Building
- U.S. National Register of Historic Places
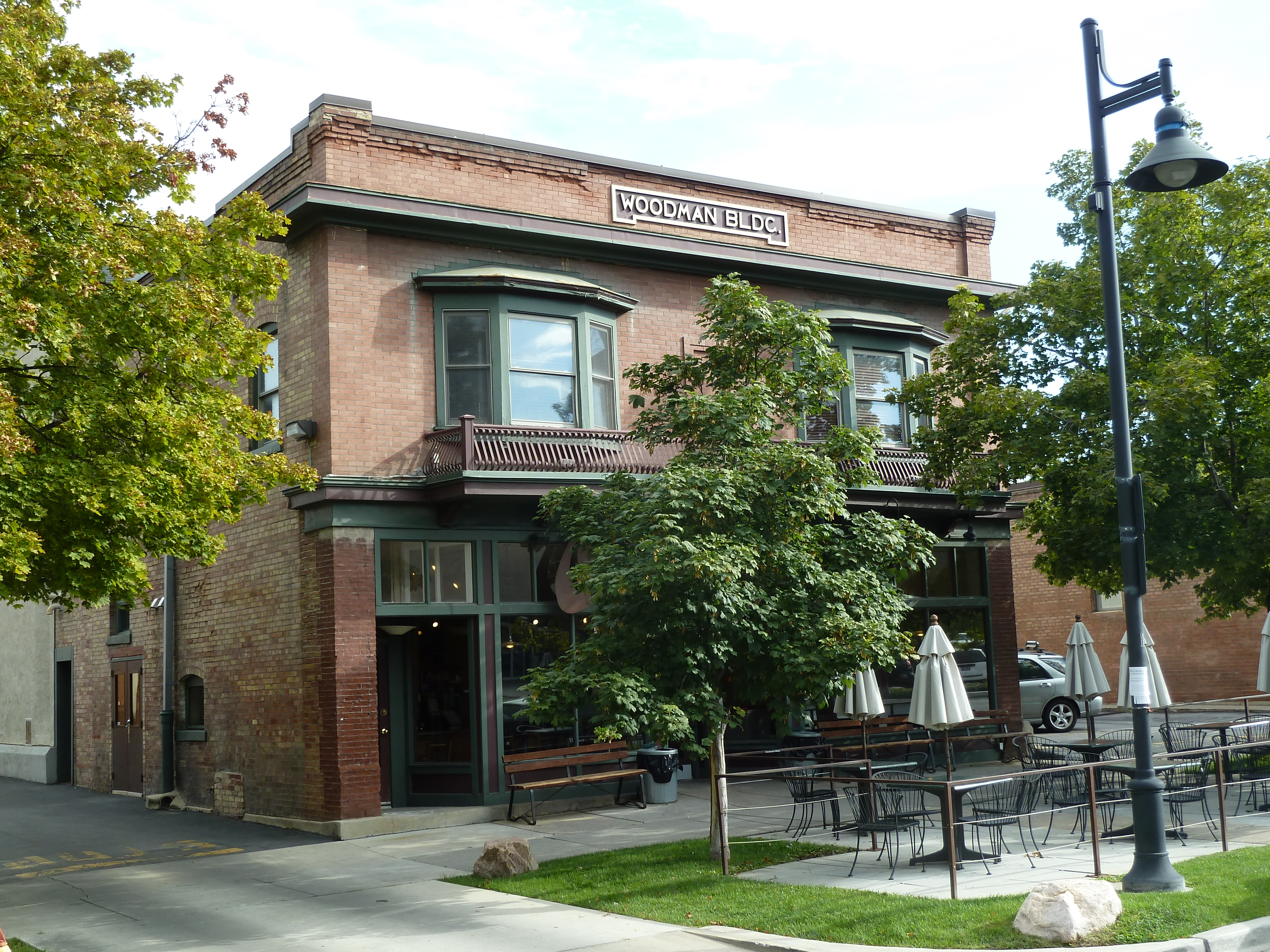
- The building in 2014

- Location within Utah Location within the United States
- Location: 859 East 900 South, Salt Lake City, Utah
- Coordinates: 40°45′00″N 111°51′55″W
- Area: 0.2 acres (0.081 ha)
- Built: 1878
- Architect: George S. Walker
- Architectural style: Late Victorian
- NRHP reference No.: 92001687
- Added to NRHP: December 17, 1992

The Lefler-Woodman Building is a historic building in Salt Lake City, Utah. The building was first erected as the Lefler Flour Mill for John Marshall Lefler, an immigrant from Canada, and completed in 1878. It was later joined by the Woodman Building, built for John A. and Frank H. Woodman and completed in 1911. The structure was designed in the Late Victorian style by architect George S. Walker. It has been listed on the National Register of Historic Places since December 17, 1992.
