= James and Susan R. Langton House =

Historic house in Salt Lake City, Utah, U.S.

- U.S. National Register of Historic Places
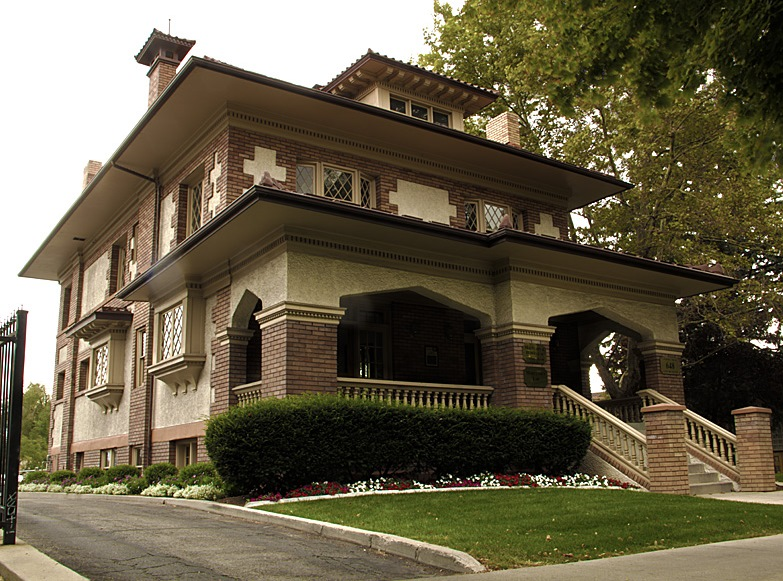
- The James and Susan R. Langton House, September 2012

- Location within Utah Location within the United States
- Location: 648 East 100 South; Salt Lake City, Utah; United States
- Coordinates: 40°46′1″N 111°52′19″W
- Area: less than one acre
- Built: 1908
- Architect: Mecklenburg, Bernard O.
- Architectural style: Box Style
- NRHP reference No.: 82001750
- Added to NRHP: November 19, 1982

The James and Susan R. Langton House, located at 648 East 100 South in Salt Lake City, Utah, United States, was built in 1908. It was listed on the National Register of Historic Places in 1982.

== Description ==
The house was found in a survey of the South and Central area of Salt Lake City to be notable as "an unusually well-designed eclectic version of the Box style house." It was designed by Bernard O. Mecklenburg. The house was built for $10,000 (equivalent to $358,000 in 2025).

== See also ==
- National Register of Historic Places listings in Salt Lake City
