= Old Clock at Zion's First National Bank =

Clock in Salt Lake City, Utah, U.S.

- U.S. National Register of Historic Places
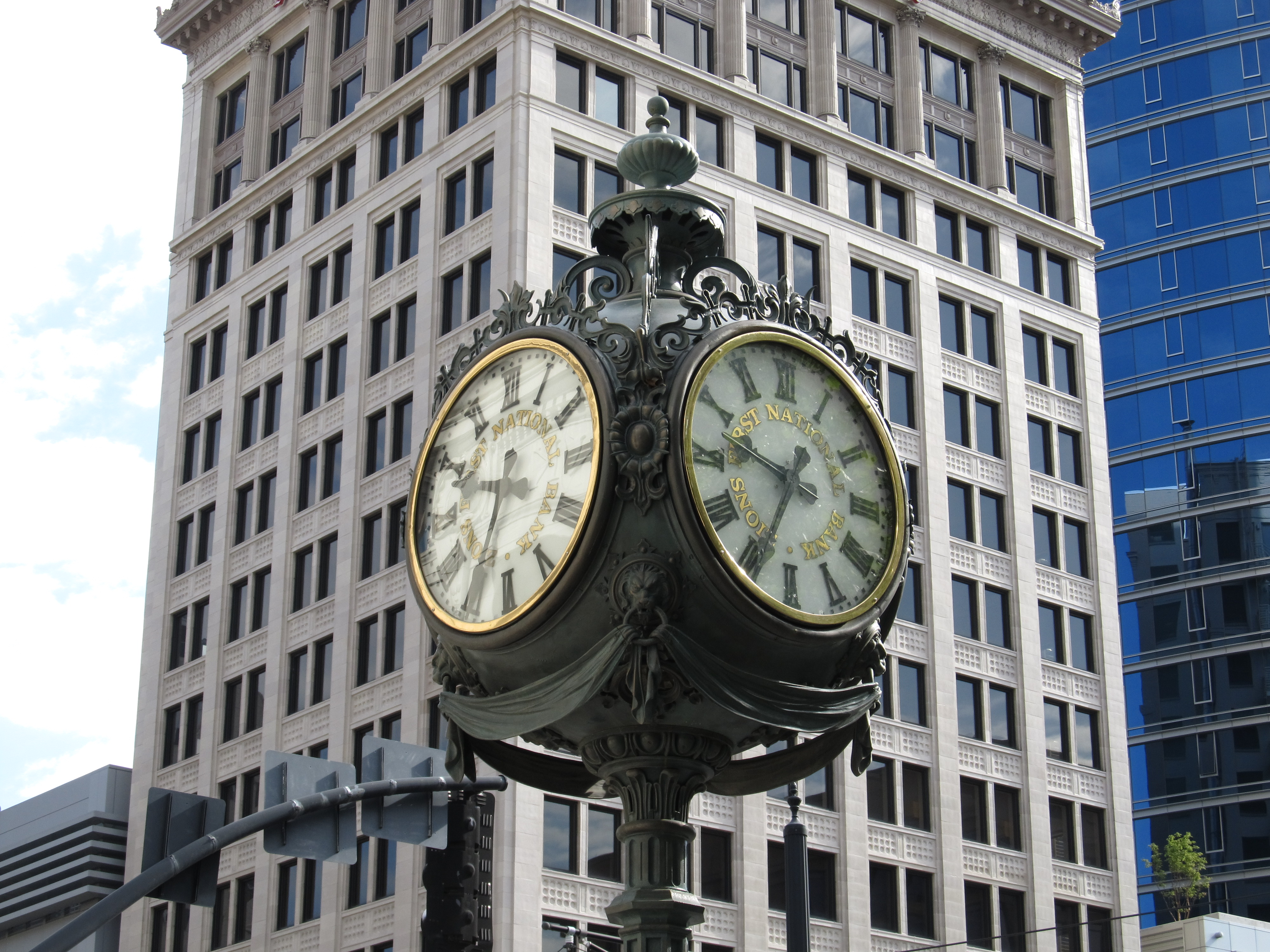
- The clock in 2012

- Location within Utah
- Location: SW corner of 1st South and Main St., Salt Lake City, Utah
- Coordinates: 40°46′01″N 111°53′27″W
- Area: less than one acre
- Built: 1870
- MPS: Salt Lake City Business District MRA
- NRHP reference No.: 82001752
- Added to NRHP: December 27, 1982

The Old Clock at Zion's First National Bank is installed in Salt Lake City, Utah, United States. The structure is listed on the National Register of Historic Places.

== See also ==
- National Register of Historic Places listings in Salt Lake City
