= Cramer House =

Historic house in Salt Lake City, Utah, U.S.

- U.S. National Register of Historic Places
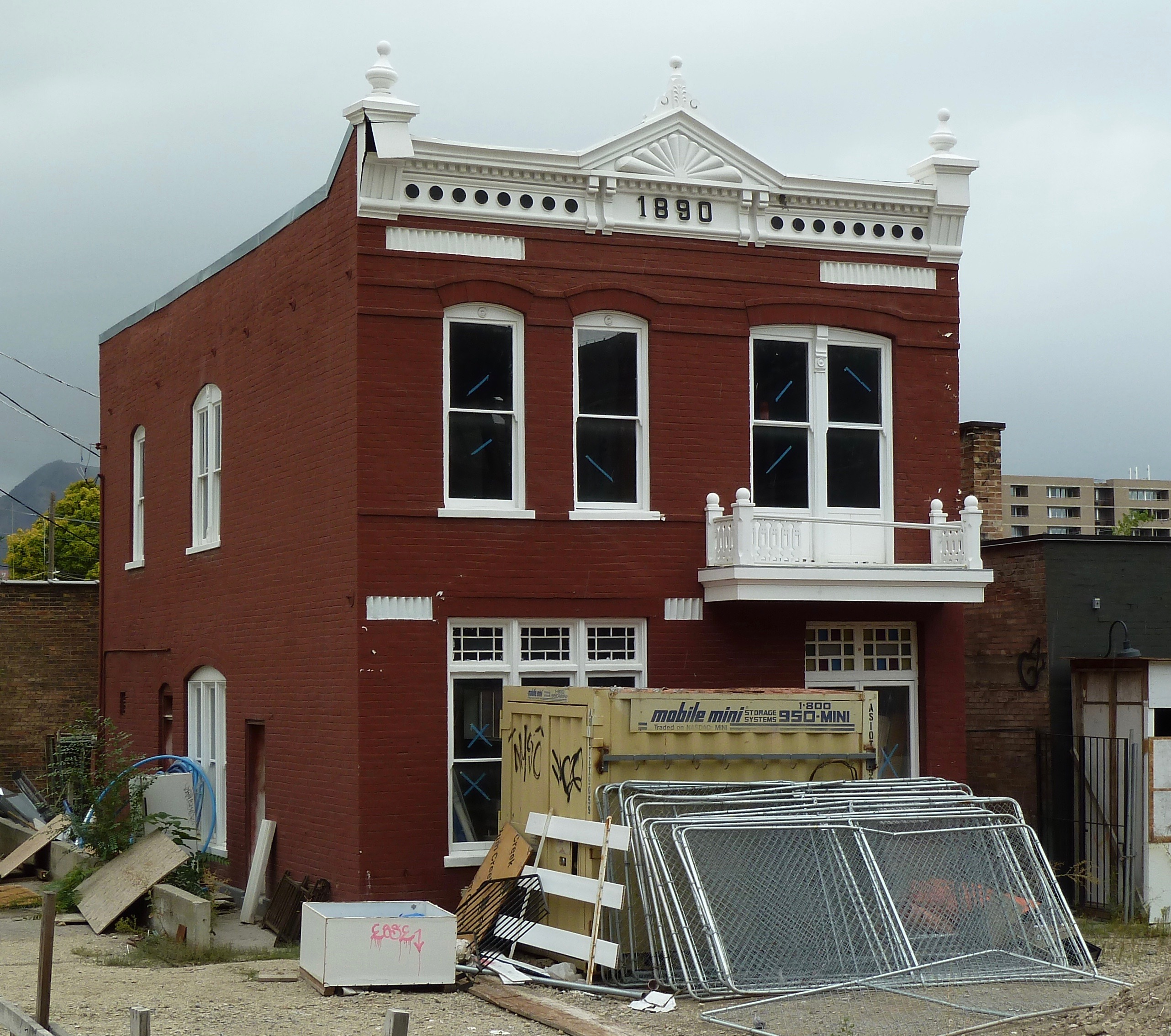
- The building in 2016

- Location within Utah Location within the United States
- Location: 241 Floral Street, Salt Lake City, Utah
- Coordinates: 40°45′50″N 111°53′16″W
- Area: 0 acres (0 ha)
- Built: 1890
- Built by: Christopher Cramer
- MPS: Salt Lake City Business District MRA
- NRHP reference No.: 82004140
- Added to NRHP: August 17, 1982

The Cramer House is a historic house at 241 Floral Street in Salt Lake City, Utah. It was built in 1890 by Christopher Cramer, an immigrant from Denmark who became a florist. His house was also his flower store until he sold it in 1897. It has been listed on the National Register of Historic Places since August 17, 1982.

It was deemed significant "as one of only two single family residences remaining in the downtown area. It documents not only the probable presence at an earlier time of other single family residential architecture in the area, but also the combination of homey residence and business in one structure in the business district."
