= Benworth-Chapman Apartments and Chapman Cottages =

Historic buildings in Salt Lake City, Utah, U.S.

- Benworth--Chapman Apartments and Chapman Cottages
- U.S. National Register of Historic Places
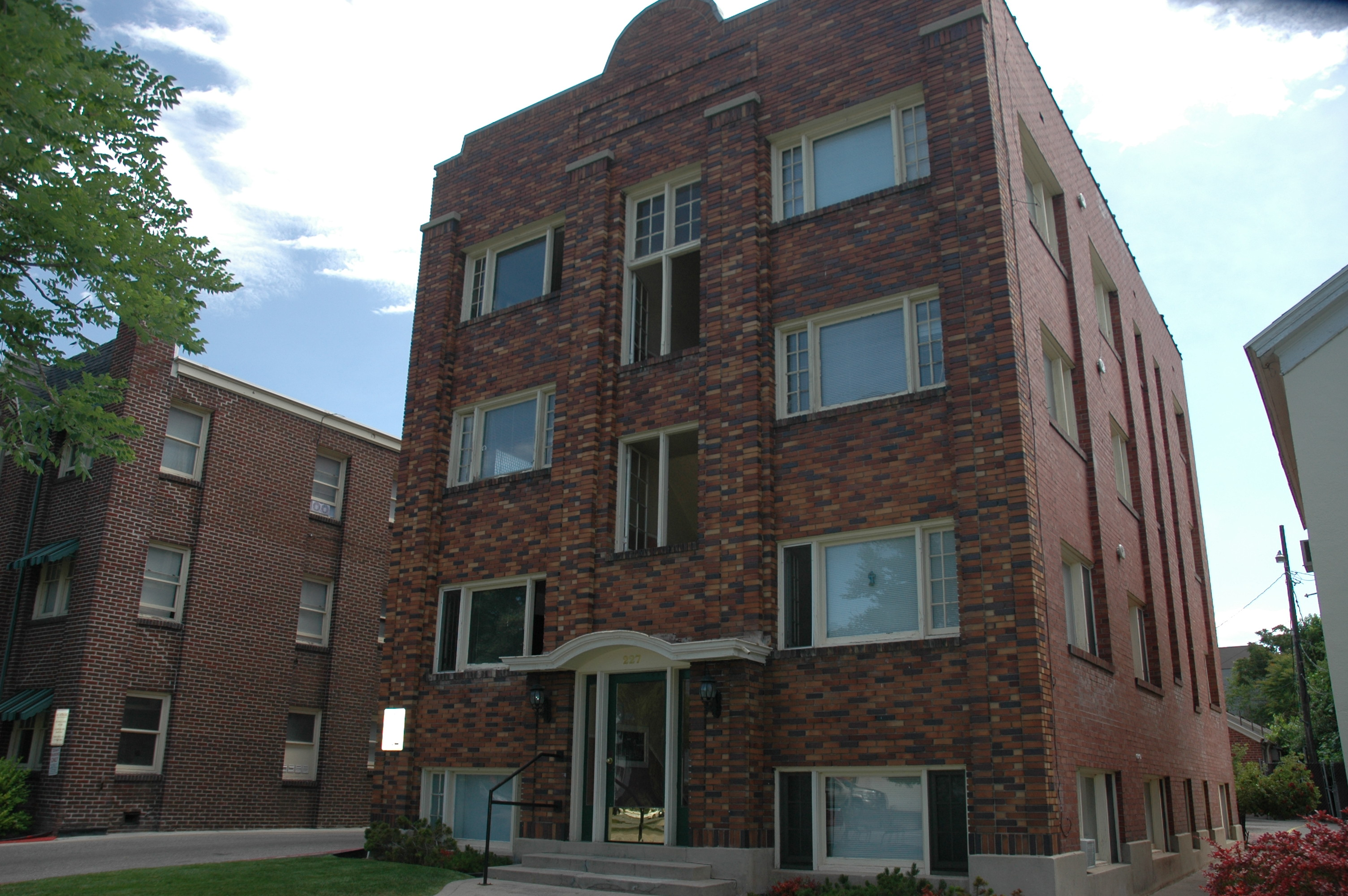
- The building complex in 2013

- Location within Utah Location within the United States
- Location: 227 South 400 East, Salt Lake City, Utah
- Coordinates: 40°45′51″N 111°52′43″W
- Area: less than one acre
- Built: 1927
- Built by: Bowles, George, & Sons
- Architectural style: Mission Revival
- MPS: Salt Lake City MPS
- NRHP reference No.: 04001417
- Added to NRHP: December 30, 2004

The Benworth-Chapman Apartments and Chapman Cottages are two apartment buildings in Salt Lake City, Utah. The Benworth-Chapman Apartments building was built as Benworth Apartments by George Bowles & Sons in 1927, and designed in the Mission Revival style. Bowles sold the building to Benjamin L. Farnsworth in 1927, and Farnsworth, his wife Alice and some of their children lived in the building with their tenants. The building belonged to the Zions Bank from 1933 to 1937, when it was acquired by Clarissa G. Chapman, who renamed it Chapman Apartments. Chapman Cottages was built in 1937–1940. It has been listed on the National Register of Historic Places since December 30, 2004.
