= Ashby Apartments =

Historic building in Salt Lake City, Utah, U.S.

- U.S. National Register of Historic Places
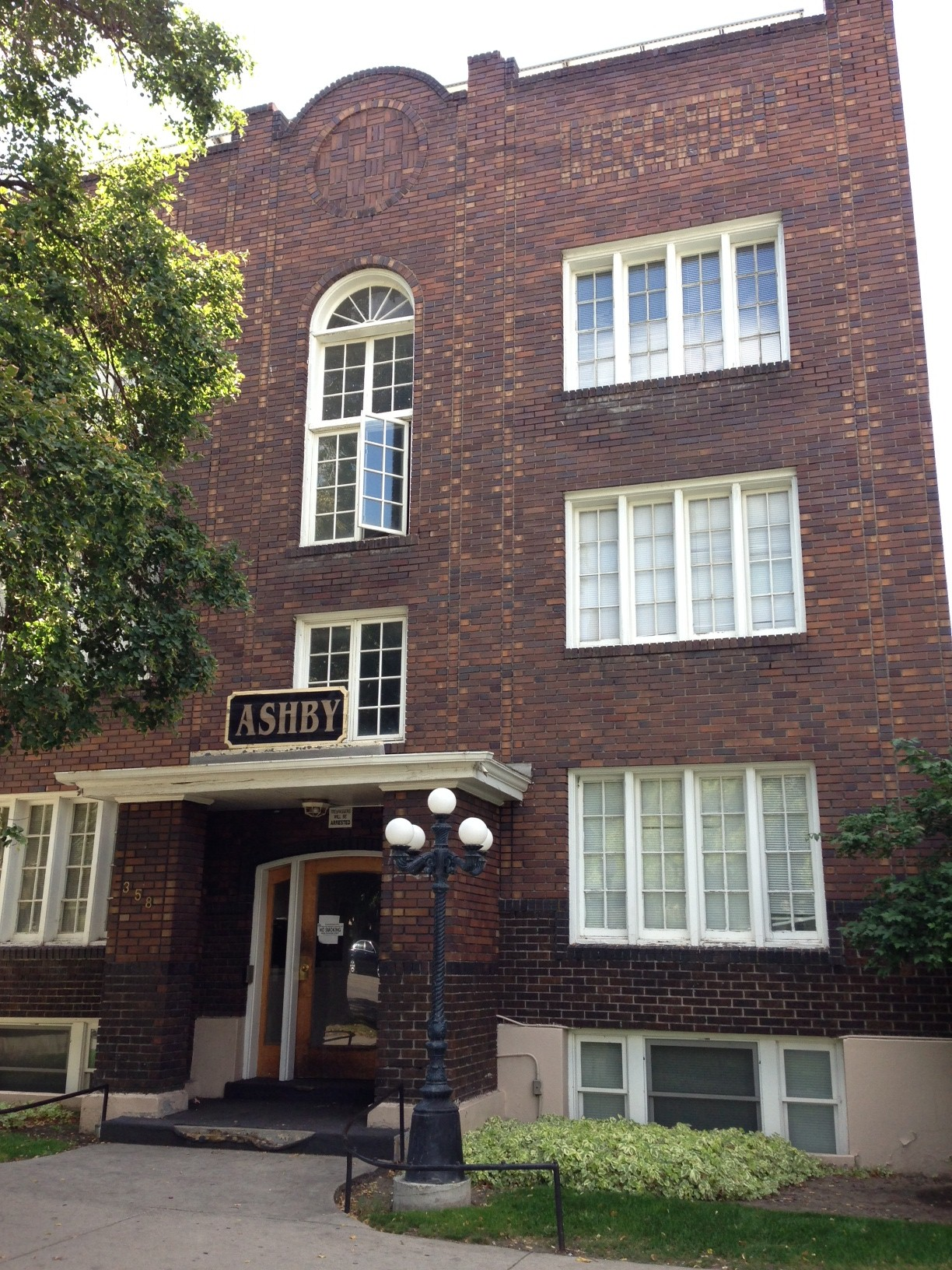
- The building in 2013

- Location within Utah Location within the United States
- Location: 358 East 100 South, Salt Lake City, Utah
- Coordinates: 40°46′01″N 111°52′49″W
- Area: 0.2 acres (0.081 ha)
- Built: 1925
- Built by: Bowers Investment Company
- Architect: Danquart Weggeland
- Architectural style: Mission Revival
- MPS: Salt Lake City MPS
- NRHP reference No.: 06001067
- Added to NRHP: November 16, 2006

Ashby Apartments, also known as Gooch Apartments and Suzanne Apartments, is a historic building in Salt Lake City, Utah. It was built in 1925-1926 for the Bowers Investment Company, and designed in the Mission Revival style. It was acquired by the Eflow Investment Company in 1926. From 1936 to 1963, it belonged to Ralph A. Badger, who owned and managed five apartment buildings in Salt Lake City, and who served as the president of the Apartment House Association of Utah. The building has been listed on the National Register of Historic Places since November 16, 2006.
