= Chapman Branch Library =

Historic library building in Salt Lake City, Utah, U.S.

- U.S. National Register of Historic Places
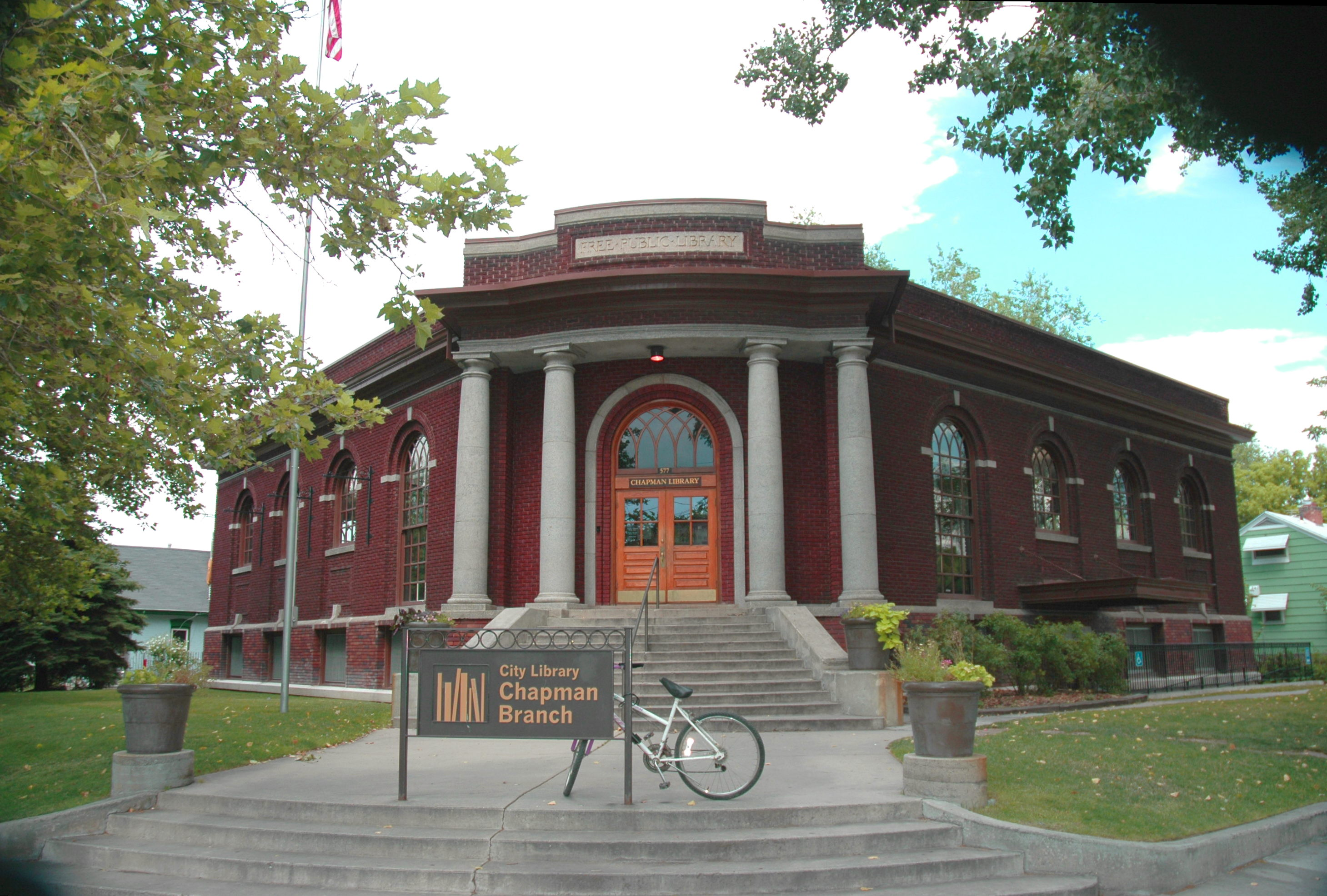

- Location within Utah Location within the United States
- Location: 577 S. 900 West, Salt Lake City, Utah
- Coordinates: 40°45′24″N 111°54′58″W
- Area: less than one acre
- Built: 1918
- Built by: Ashton Improvement Co.
- Architect: Don Carlos Young, Jr.
- Architectural style: Classical Revival
- NRHP reference No.: 80003918
- Added to NRHP: January 20, 1980

The Chapman Branch Library in Salt Lake City, Utah, United States, is a Carnegie library that was funded by a $25,000 Carnegie Foundation grant and was built in 1918. It was listed on the National Register of Historic Places in 1980.

== Description ==
The library was named after Annie E. Chapman, first librarian of the Salt Lake City public library system.

It is an L-shaped building designed in Classical Revival architecture by architect Don Carlos Young, Jr., who also designed the layout of the University of Utah campus and a number of LDS buildings. At the time of its dedication, a Deseret News account declared it "'the beginning of the greatest social, intellectual and civic development the west side of the city has yet known.'!".

== See also ==
- National Register of Historic Places listings in Salt Lake City
