= Armista Apartments =

Building in Salt Lake City, Utah, U.S.

- U.S. National Register of Historic Places
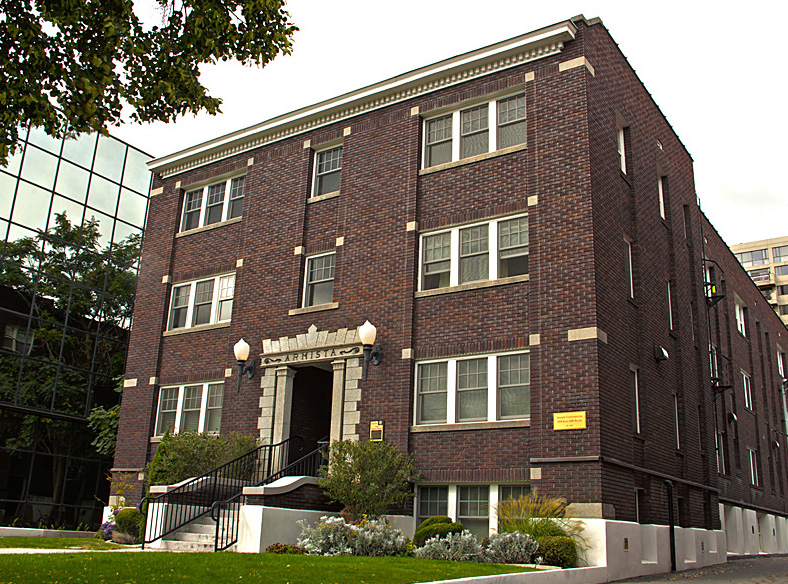

- Location within Utah Location within the United States
- Location: 555 Eeat 100 South; Salt Lake City, Utah; United States
- Coordinates: 40°46′4″N 111°52′2″W
- Area: less than one acre
- Built: 1927
- Built by: Herrick & Co.
- Architectural style: Colonial Revival, Double-loaded corridor plan
- MPS: Salt Lake City MPS
- NRHP reference No.: 89001736
- Added to NRHP: October 20, 1989

The Armista Apartments, known also as the Waldorf Apartments, at 555 East 100 South in Salt Lake City, Utah, United States were built in 1927. They were listed on the National Register of Historic Places in 1989.

The building is significant as representing the urbanization of Salt Lake City during 1890–1930, a period in which more than 180 "urban apartments" (apartment buildings) were built. Urban apartments were a new and important type of housing, that "document[ed] the accommodation of builders and residents to the realities of crowded living conditions and high land values", as opposed to suburban style architecture that would signify denial of urbanization.

The apartment building was built for about $80,000 and its apartments were advertised as "Splendid 3-room apartments, equipped with electric ranges and electric refrigeration. $40.00 to $42.00. One of the most modernly equipped and conveniently located apartments in the city."

The apartments were renovated in 2007.

== See also ==
- National Register of Historic Places listings in Salt Lake City
