= Tenth Ward Square =

Historic district in Salt Lake City, Utah, U.S.

- U.S. National Register of Historic Places
- U.S. Historic district
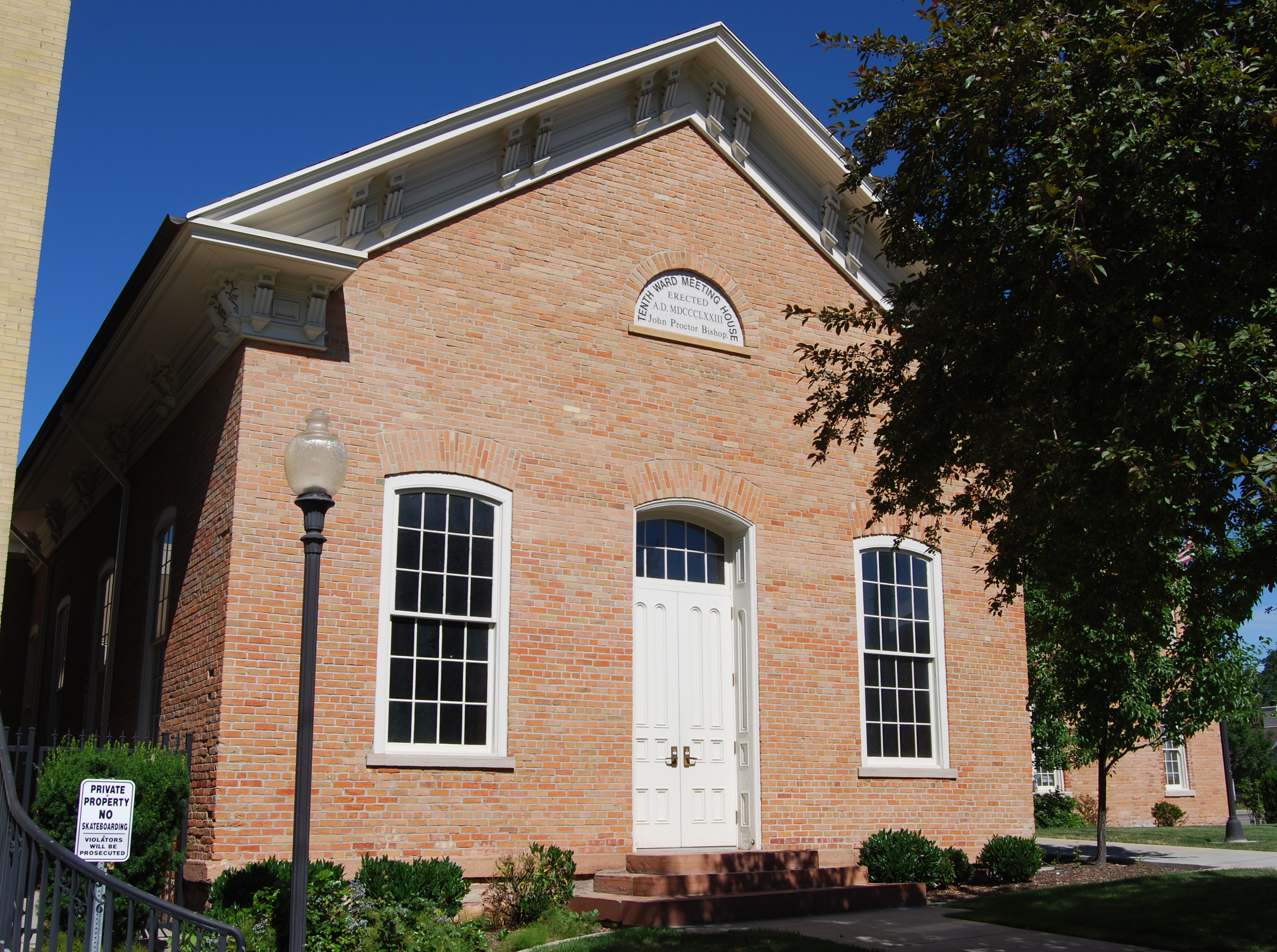
- Tenth Ward LDS Meeting House, June 2007

- Location within Utah Location within the United States
- Location: 400 South and 800 East; Salt Lake City, Utah; United States
- Coordinates: 40.7603°N 111.8687°W
- Area: 1.7 acres (0.69 ha)
- Built: 1873
- Architect: Multiple
- Architectural style: Late Gothic Revival, Greek Revival, Late Victorian
- NRHP reference No.: 77001314
- Added to NRHP: November 11, 1977

The Tenth Ward Square is a 1.7-acre (0.69 ha) historic district in northeast Salt Lake City, Utah, United States that was listed on the National Register of Historic Places in 1977.

== Description ==
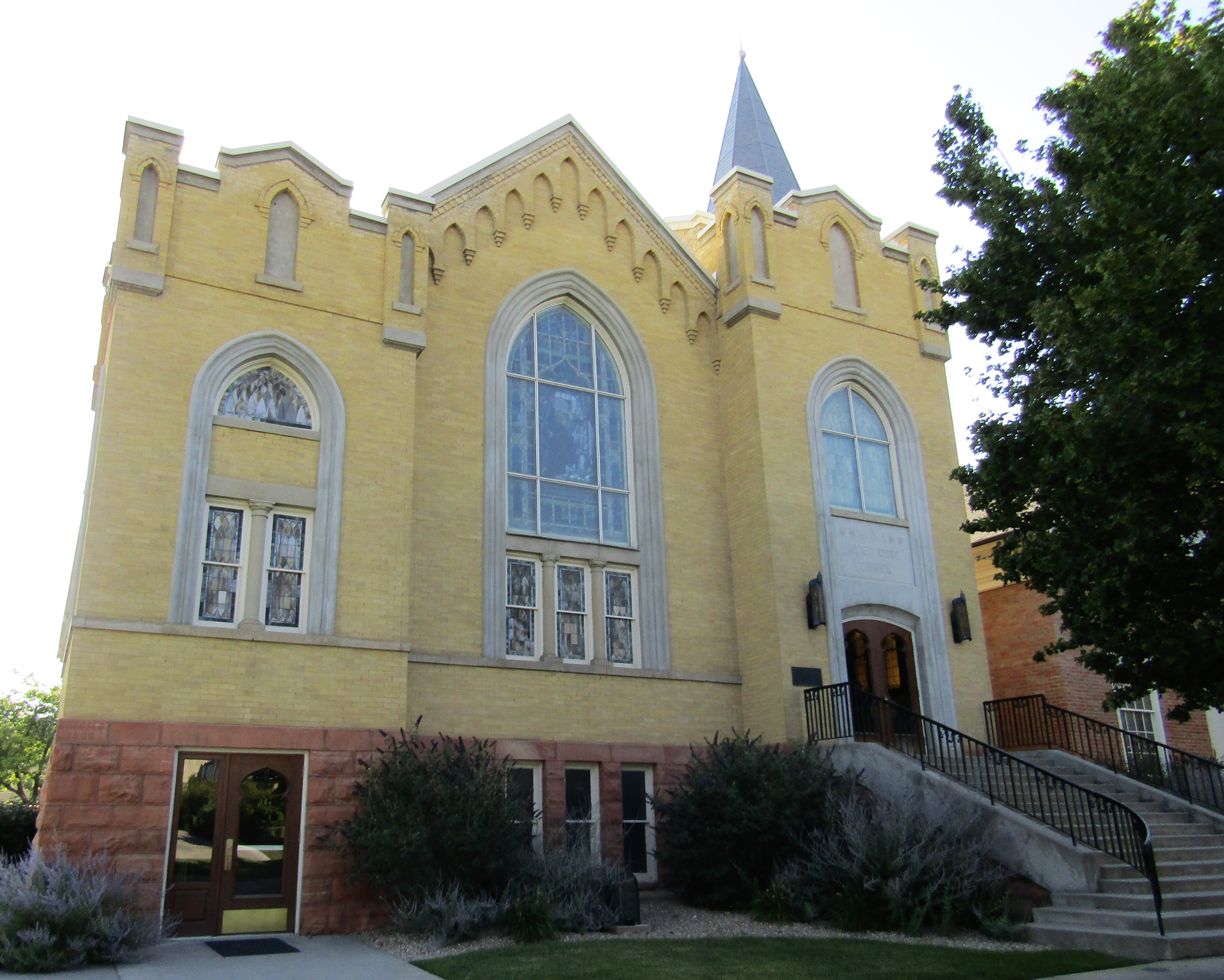
LDS Tenth Ward Chapel, July 2017

The district includes Late Gothic Revival, Greek Revival, and Late Victorian architecture in four contributing buildings.

It includes an 1873 one-room Mormon meeting house, a c.1880 store with included residence, an 1887 school, and a 1909 chapel. The store appears to be one of the first works of architect Richard K. A. Kletting. The church, designed by the Ashton Brothers, is "known for its impressive stained glass window".

== See also ==
- National Register of Historic Places listings in Salt Lake City
