= Third Presbyterian Church Parsonage =

Historic building in Salt Lake City, Utah, U.S.

- U.S. National Register of Historic Places
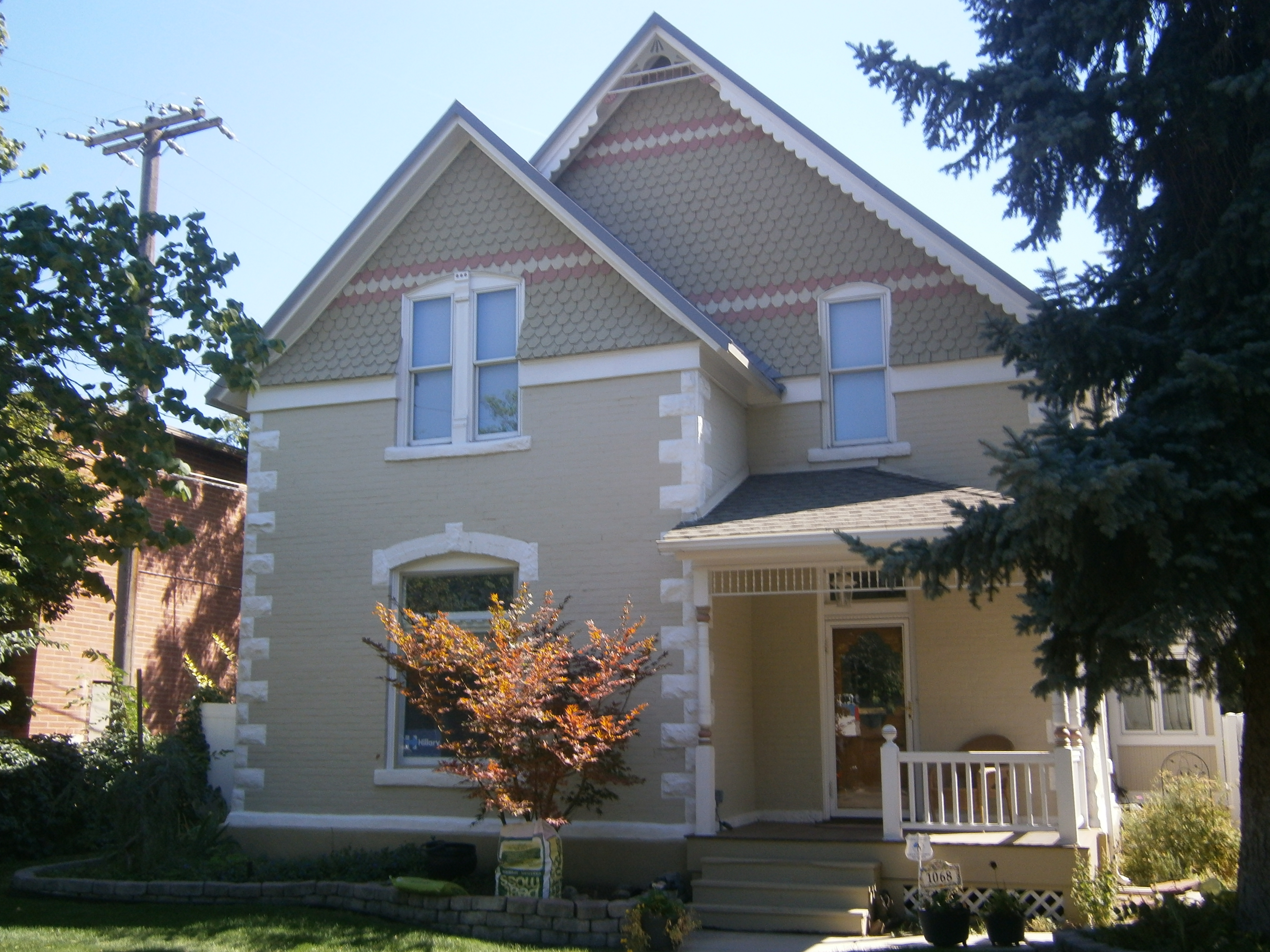

- Location within Utah Location within the United States
- Location: 1068 E. Blaine Ave., Salt Lake City, Utah
- Coordinates: 40°43′56″N 111°51′35″W
- Area: less than one acre
- Built: c.1890
- Architectural style: Late Victorian, Rectangular Block
- NRHP reference No.: 00000522
- Added to NRHP: May 19, 2000

Third Presbyterian Church Parsonage is a historic Presbyterian parsonage at 1068 E. Blaine Avenue in Salt Lake City, Utah.

The Late Victorian, Rectangular Block building was constructed in 1890. It was added to the National Register in 2000.

It is significant for association with the Third Presbyterian Church of Salt Lake City, which itself "had a significant influence on the development of the southeast bench of the city", apparently spurring and reflecting non-Mormon development. According to its NRHP nomination, the "house was built c.1890 but its significance dates from 1912-1929 when it was owned by the church and served as the minister's residence."
