= Felt Electric =

Historic building in Salt Lake City, Utah, U.S.

- U.S. National Register of Historic Places
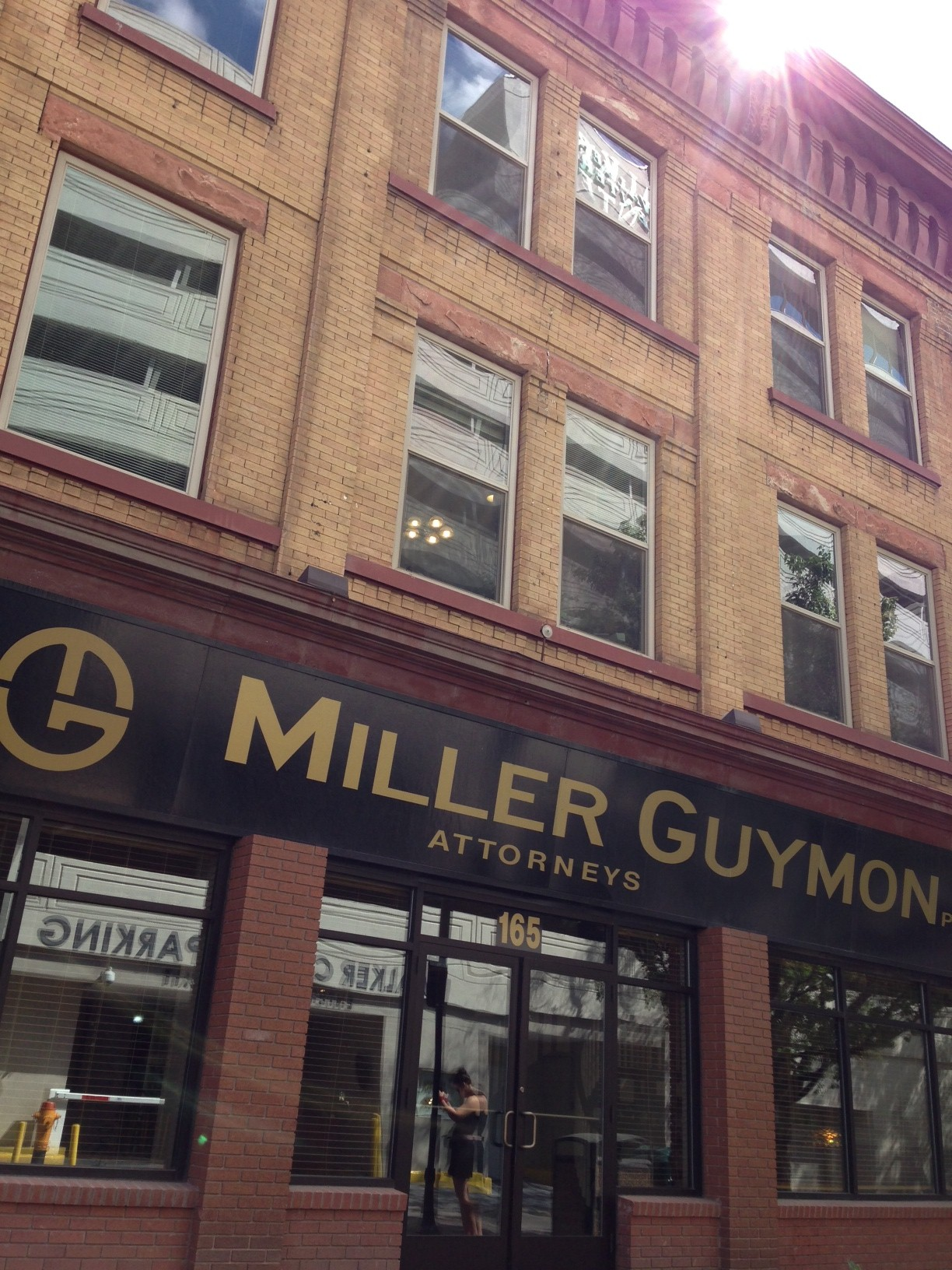

- Location within Utah Location within the United States
- Location: 165 S. Regent St., Salt Lake City, Utah
- Coordinates: 40°45′55″N 111°53′20″W
- Built: 1893
- MPS: Salt Lake City Business District MRA
- NRHP reference No.: 82004141
- Added to NRHP: August 17, 1982

Felt Electric, at 165 S. Regent St. in Salt Lake City, Utah, was built in 1893. It was listed on the National Register of Historic Places in 1982.

According to historian John McCormick,

This building is significant as one of three remaining buildings that once were houses of prostitution on the street that was Salt Lake City's red-light district from about 1880 until the late 1930s. As such, it is deeply woven into the fabric of the community and documents much about the social and political history of Salt Lake. / The building was constructed in 1893 for Gustave S. Holmes. A prominent Salt Lake City businessman, he owned the fashionable Knutsford Hotel, was a director of the National Bank of the Republic, had extensive mining interests, and in 1909 was reported to be the 5th or 6th largest taxpayer in Salt Lake County. From the time it was built until at least the late teens, the upper floor of the building housed a brothel, while a legitimate business, the Leader Cigar factory, occupied the ground floor.
