= Hollywood Apartments =

Historic building in Salt Lake City, Utah, U.S.

- U.S. National Register of Historic Places
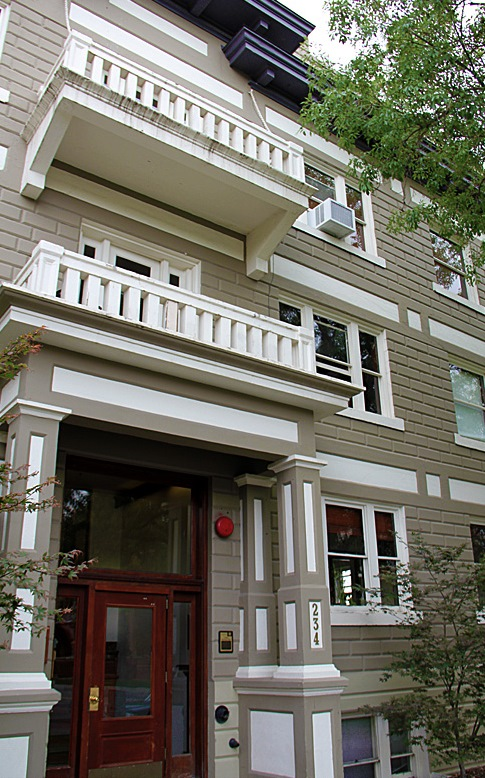

- Location within Utah Location within the United States
- Location: 234 E. 100 South, Salt Lake City, Utah
- Coordinates: 40°46′1″N 111°53′2″W
- Area: less than one acre
- Built: 1909
- Built by: Wilfley, J. M.
- Architectural style: Classical Revival
- MPS: Salt Lake City MPS
- NRHP reference No.: 94000302
- Added to NRHP: April 7, 1994

The Hollywood Apartments, at 234 E. 100 South in Salt Lake City, Utah, were built in 1909. The property was listed on the National Register of Historic Places in 1994.

It is significant as a representative example of more than 180 apartment buildings built in Salt Lake City during 1900-1933 that were part of transformation of the city into an urban environment. The building was built and owned by J.M. Wilfley.
