= Bertolini Block =

Historic building in Salt Lake City, Utah, U.S.

- U.S. National Register of Historic Places
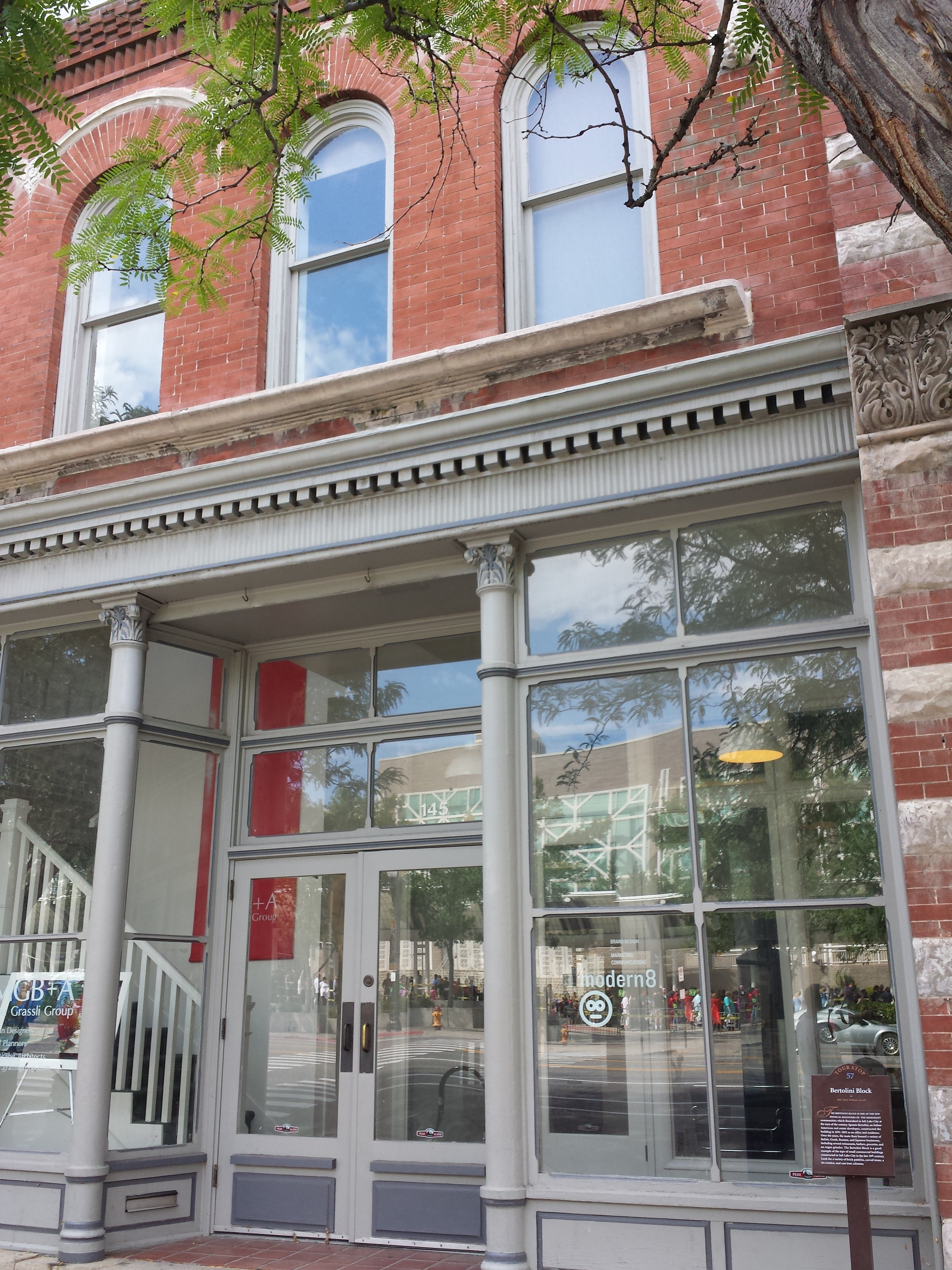

- Location within Utah
- Location: 143 1/2 W. 200 South, Salt Lake City, Utah
- Coordinates: 40°45′53″N 111°53′41″W
- Area: less than one acre
- Built: 1892
- Architect: Carroll, William
- NRHP reference No.: 76001822
- Added to NRHP: September 29, 1976

The Bertolini Block, at 143 1/2 W. 200 South in Salt Lake City, Utah, was built in 1892. It was listed on the National Register of Historic Places in 1976.

It is a two-story brick building whose three store spaces on its main floor long served ethnic minority businesses. It was designed by architect William Carroll, previously of Provo. It was built at cost of $5,000 for Ignazio Bertolini, an Italian-American real estate developer in Salt Lake City in the early 1890s.
