= Boulevard Gardens Historic District =

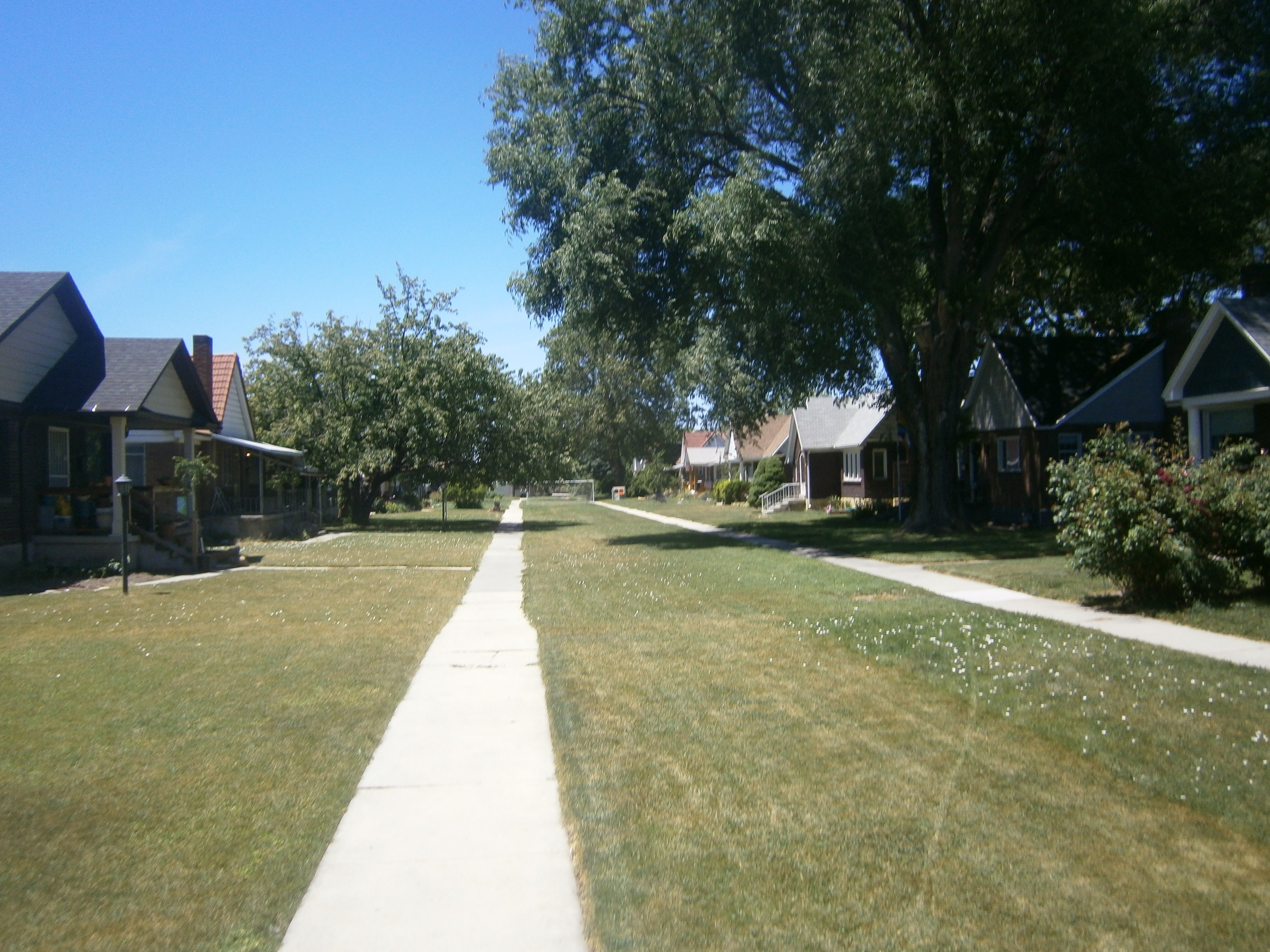
Homes in the Boulevard Gardens Historic District

The Boulevard Gardens Historic District is an historic district roughly bounded by Quayle Avenue, Main and West Temple Streets, in Salt Lake City, Utah. The district was listed on the National Register of Historic Places on December 31, 2018.
