= Walter C. Lyne House =

Historic building in Salt Lake City, Utah, U.S.

- U.S. National Register of Historic Places
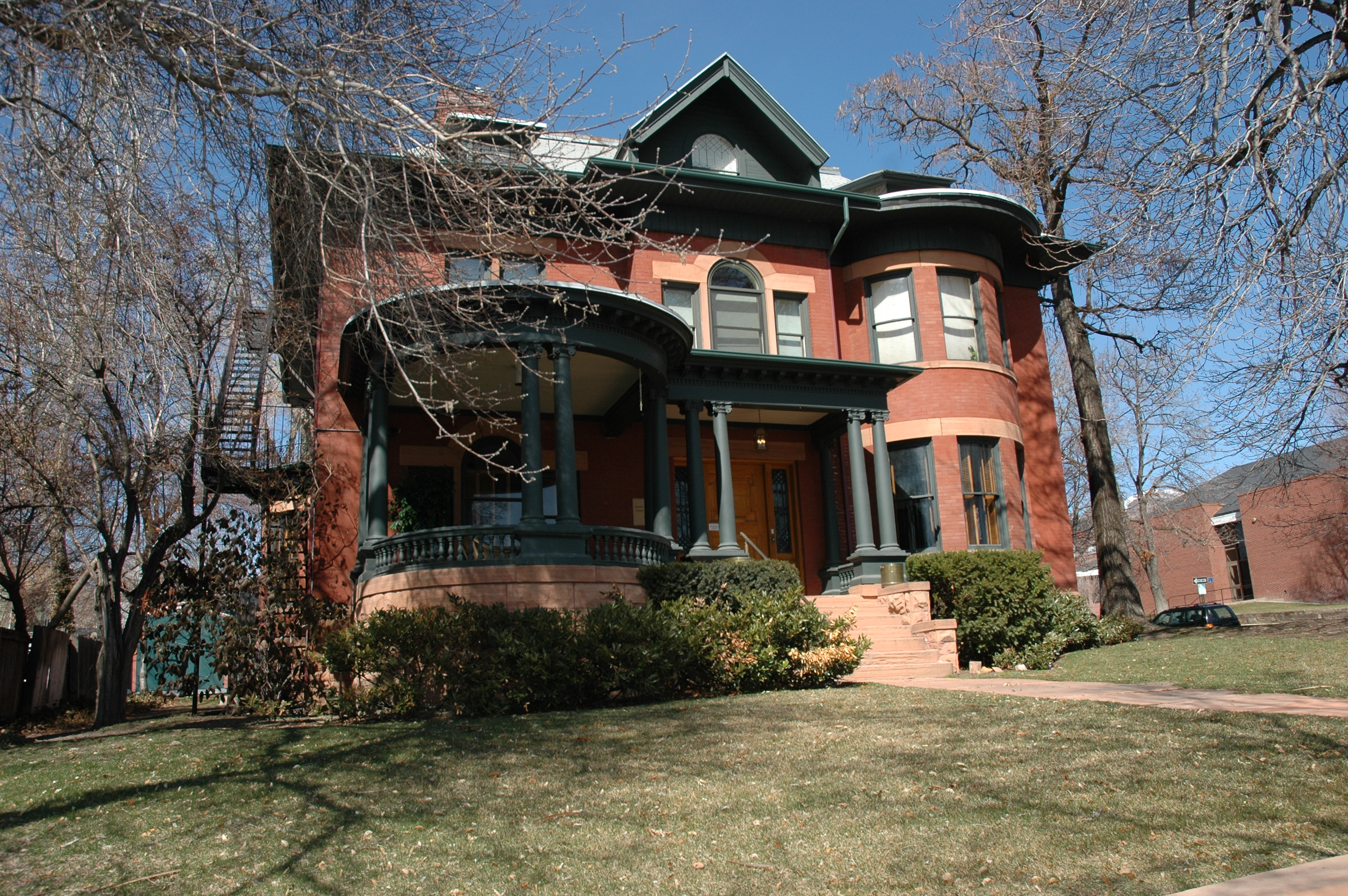

- Location within Utah Location within the United States
- Location: 1135 E. South Temple St., Salt Lake City, Utah
- Coordinates: 40°46′11″N 111°51′28″W
- Area: less than one acre
- Built: 1898
- Built by: Melton, Jasper N.
- Architectural style: Colonial Revival, Georgian Revival
- NRHP reference No.: 79003495
- Added to NRHP: March 9, 1979

The Walter C. Lyne House, at 1135 East South Temple St. in Salt Lake City, Utah, was built in 1898. It was listed on the National Register of Historic Places in 1979.

It was built for Walter C. Lyne, and is "considered to be the finest remaining work of Jasper N. Melton, a local builder who also designed the homes he built."
