= Thomas and Mary Hepworth House =

Historic house in Salt Lake City, Utah, U.S.

- U.S. National Register of Historic Places
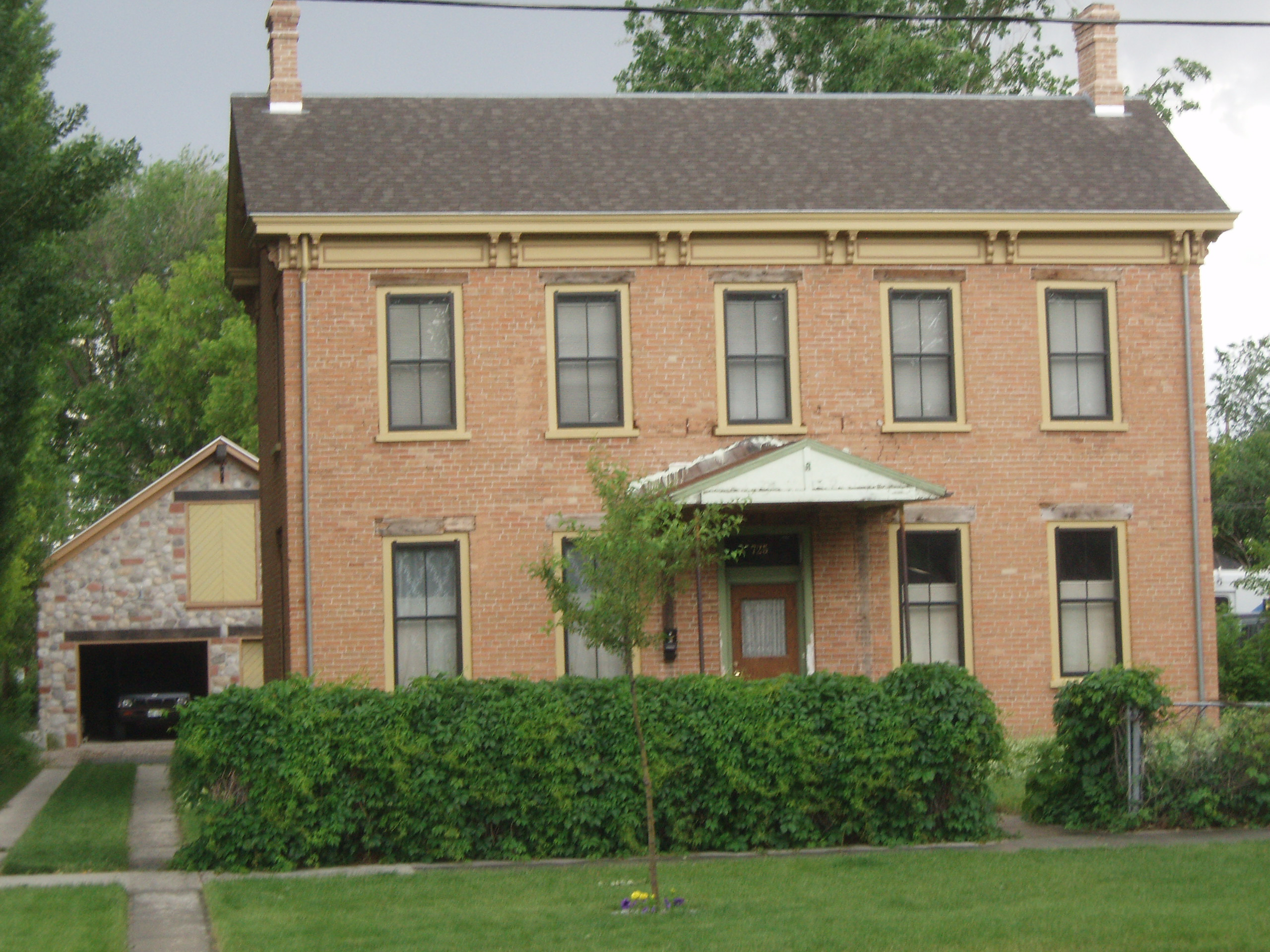
- Hepworth House in 2009

- Location within Utah Location within the United States
- Location: 725 West 200 North, Salt Lake City, Utah
- Coordinates: 40°46′25″N 111°54′40″W
- Area: 0.29 acres (0.12 ha)
- Built: 1877
- Architectural style: Italianate, I-house
- NRHP reference No.: 00000404
- Added to NRHP: April 21, 2000

The Thomas & Mary Hepworth House is a historic house in Salt Lake City, Utah.

== Description and history ==
Constructed in 1877, it is locally significant as the only known example of two-story, Italianate I-house design in Salt Lake City. It is significant architecturally as an expression of traditional central-passage plan houses in Utah, but also "updated with more vertical Victorian proportions and with stylish Italianate detailing."

It was listed on the National Register of Historic Places on April 21, 2000.
