= John Platts House =

Historic house in Salt Lake City, Utah, U.S.

- U.S. National Register of Historic Places
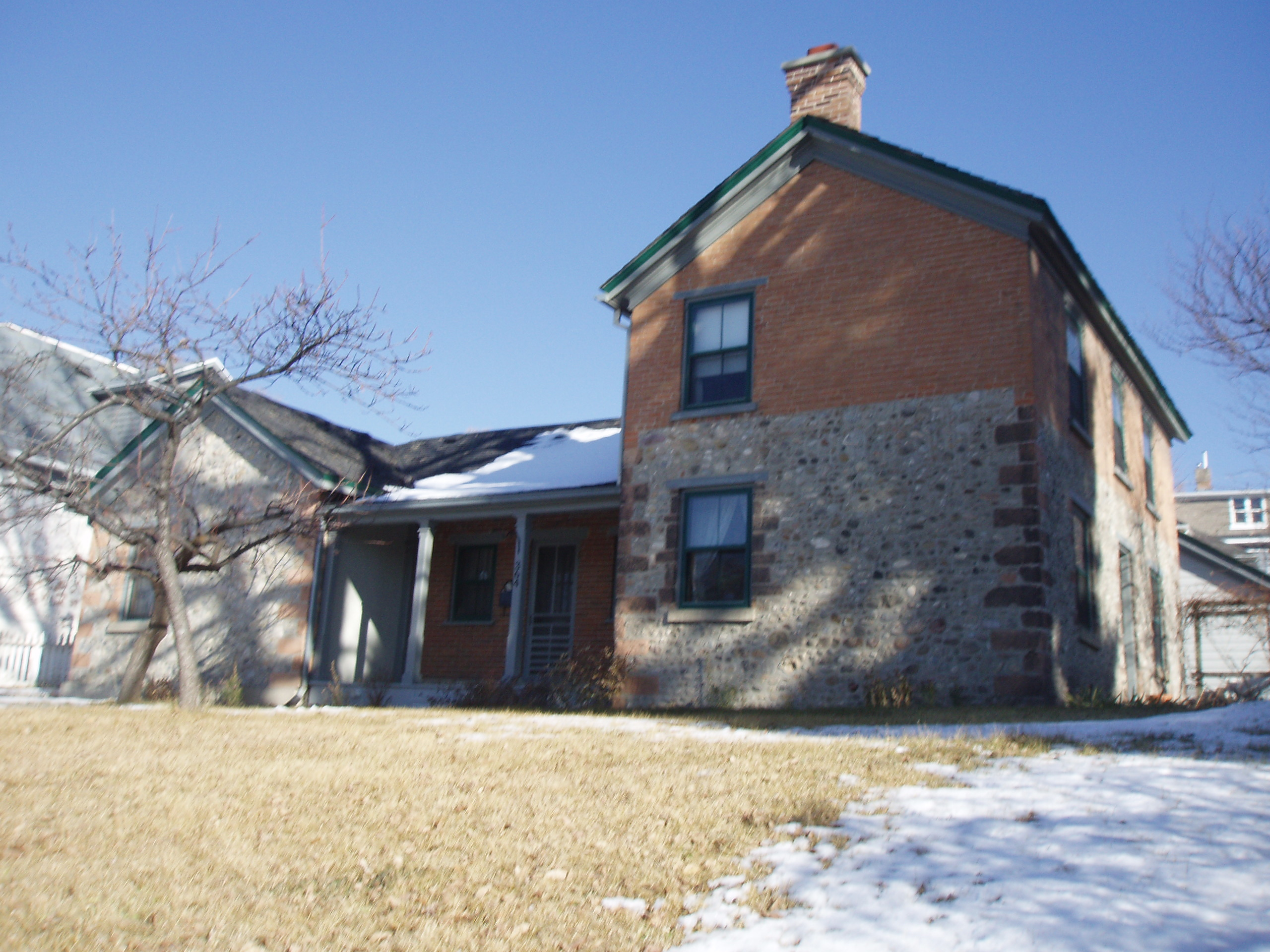

- Location within Utah Location within the United States
- Location: 364 Quince St., Salt Lake City, Utah
- Coordinates: 40°46′40″N 111°53′39″W
- Area: 0.2 acres (0.081 ha)
- Built: 1858
- NRHP reference No.: 72001259
- Added to NRHP: August 25, 1972

The John Platts House, at 364 Quince St. in Salt Lake City, Utah, was built in 1858.

It is termed by the Utah Heritage Foundation as an "excellent example of Utah's early architecture" and is included in the locally defined Marmalade Hill Historic District.

It is a "good example" of a pioneer home.

The house was listed on the National Register of Historic Places in 1972.
