= A Fireproof House for $5000 =

Design and article by Frank Lloyd Wright

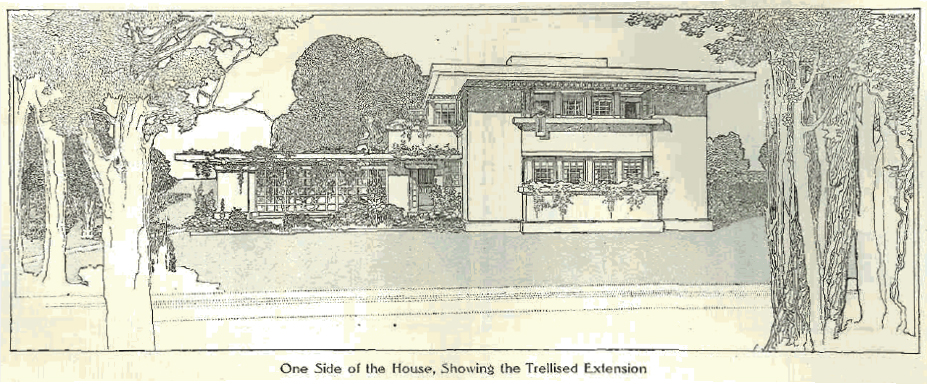
Perspective drawing of the "Fireproof House".

"A Fireproof House for $5000" is an article and house design by Frank Lloyd Wright published in the Ladies' Home Journal in April 1907. It is Wright's third and final publication in the journal following "A Home in a Prairie Town" and "A Small House with 'Lots of Room in It'" from February and July 1901, respectively. The drawings for the house were also included in Wright's 1910 Wasmuth Portfolio (Plate XIV).

== Design ==
Frank Lloyd Wright was not the only voice advocating for fireproof homes in the early twentieth century; from 1902 to 1908, Thomas Edison was also experimenting with designs for mass-produced houses as part of the Edison Portland Cement Company. The notion of concrete houses was further popularized in several books by the Atlas Portland Cement Company. The appeal of concrete dwellings was not only the resistance to fire, but also to insects, moisture, and the effects of weather. The walls, floors, roof, and chimney of Wright's design were to be constructed of reinforced concrete or as Wright stated: "a masonry monolith ... interlaced with steel fibres". Interior partitions were specified as plaster over either metal lath or three-inch clay tile blocks. Unlike the house shell, the interiors were to have been outfitted with more combustible wood millwork, casework, and flooring.

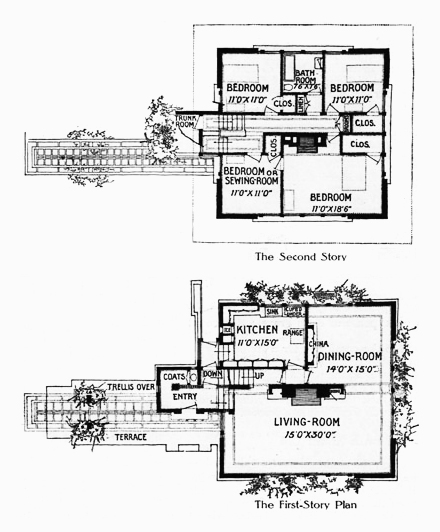
First and second floor plans

As the title of the article suggested, Wright intended the house to be relatively inexpensive. He determined US$5,000 to be the best balance between low cost and quality, low-maintenance construction ($172,768 in 2025 dollars). However, at a time when the average American salary was less than $700 a year ($24,187 in 2025 dollars) and Gustav Stickley was advertising houses in The Craftsman that could be built for as little as $2,000 to $4,000, Wright's design was still only affordable for middle-class households. Nevertheless, economy was one of the key considerations in conceiving the plans. Cost cutting features included a compact, two-story floor plan which measured 30 feet (9.1 m) square plus a narrow entry and stairway extension. The four sides were also designed identically, so that a single set of concrete forms could have been used — only minor modifications would have been required to accommodate the stairwell. Interior spaces were pared down as much as possible by eliminating the back stairwell, butler's pantry, and food pantry, by limiting circulation space on both levels, and by combining all public spaces into a single, combined living room and dining room. In typical style, Wright also did away with the attic. However, defied his own doctrine by giving the dwelling a full basement storeroom.

In addition to durability and expense, Wright incorporated such factors as thermal comfort into the design. First, he indicated that concrete construction would keep the house cooler in the summer and warmer in the winter. Concrete walls have greater thermal mass than walls of wood, and thereby lessen temperature fluctuations during the day and throughout the year. Furthermore, the roof overhang would have reduced overheating by shading part of the walls in summer. A third feature was perhaps the most innovative: Wright specified that the ceilings for the second floor rooms be installed eight inches below the roof slab. The resulting air space was to be fed by vents beneath the eaves and exhausted through the chimney to create a constant stream of moving air. Modern homes often use a similar soffit and ridge vent combination to keep the attic and the floor below cooler. Yet, at the time of publication, most wood houses lacked attic ventilation, because buildings were not constructed as tightly as those built in recent years. The monolithic construction of the Fireproof House would have prevented most natural air infiltration, making the ventilated air space a necessity.

The layout of the Fireproof House is a response to the American Foursquare, a format popular across the United States in the early 1900s. The Foursquare and Fireproof House shared the common cause for simpler, more economical design. The typical American Foursquare was a simple two-story box divided into four equal quadrants per floor. On the main level, the entrance hall and living room occupied the front corners, while a dining room and kitchen split the back of the house. Three or four bedrooms and a bathroom fit into each quadrant of the upstairs. Wright modified this basic plan by shifting the stairs and entrance to a less prominent location at the side of the house, allowing the living room an entire half of the first floor. The wall between the dining room and living room was removed to create a single L-shaped room (see floor plans at right).

== Built examples ==
=== By Frank Lloyd Wright ===
Wright was never commissioned to construct the Fireproof House exactly as it had appeared in the Ladies' Home Journal, but several variations of the design were built in the following years. Most of the houses were erected with stucco covered wood-framed walls, and so were not "fireproof" in any way.

- Tan-Y-Deri (Andrew T. Porter House), Spring Green, Wisconsin, 1907
- Stephen M. B. Hunt House I, La Grange, Illinois, 1907
- Dr. G.C. Stockman House, Mason City, Iowa, 1908
- Raymond W. Evans House, Chicago, Illinois, 1908
- Rev. Jesse R. Zeigler House, Frankfort, Kentucky, 1909–10
- Edmund D. Brigham House, Glencoe, Illinois, 1909. The only Fireproof House for $5,000 — and only Prairie house — actually made out of fire resistant concrete
- The 5 Ravine Bluffs Development rentals, Glencoe, Illinois, 1915
- Emil Bach House
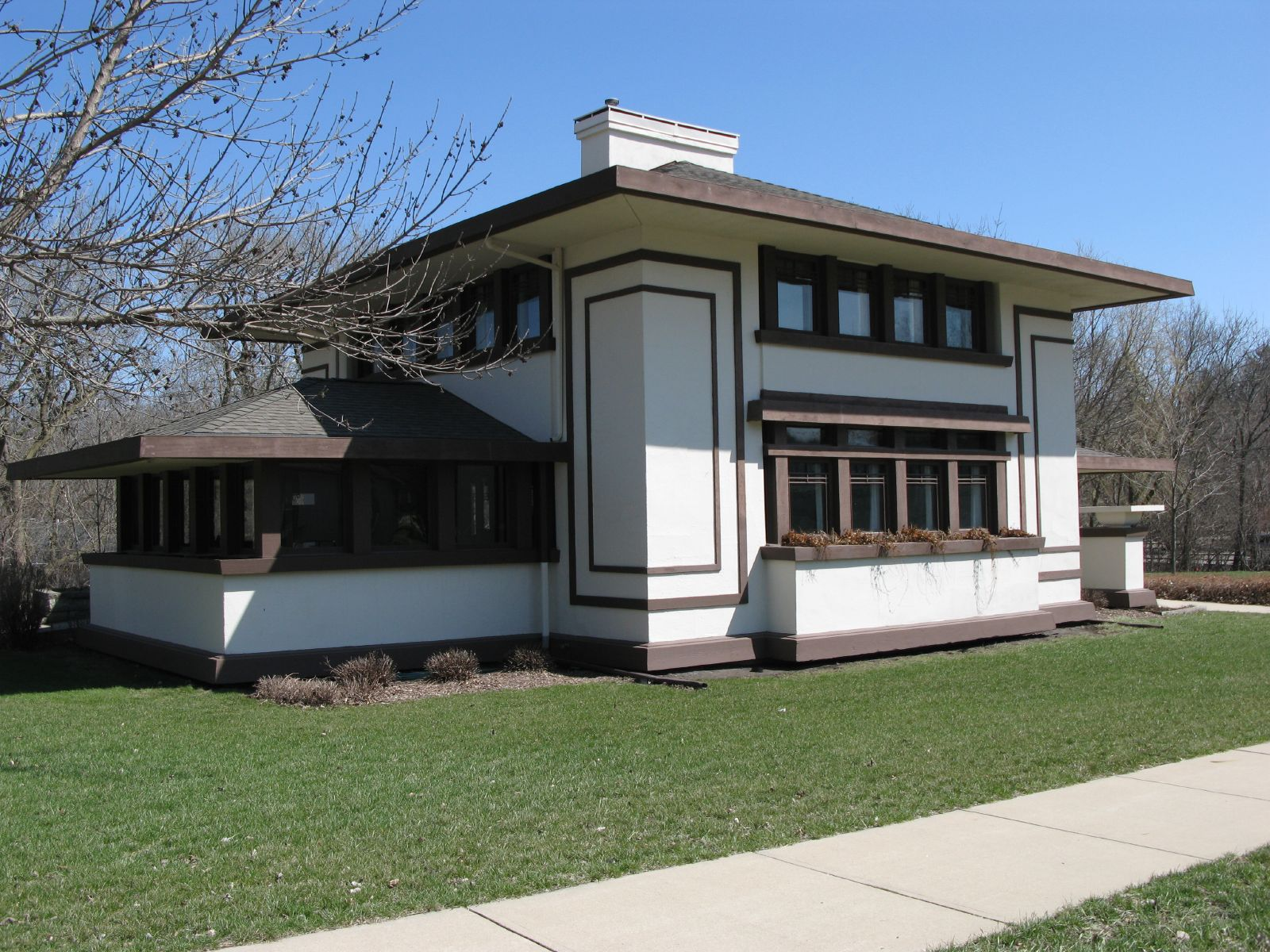
Dr. G.C. Stockman House showing the altered hip roof and added covered veranda.

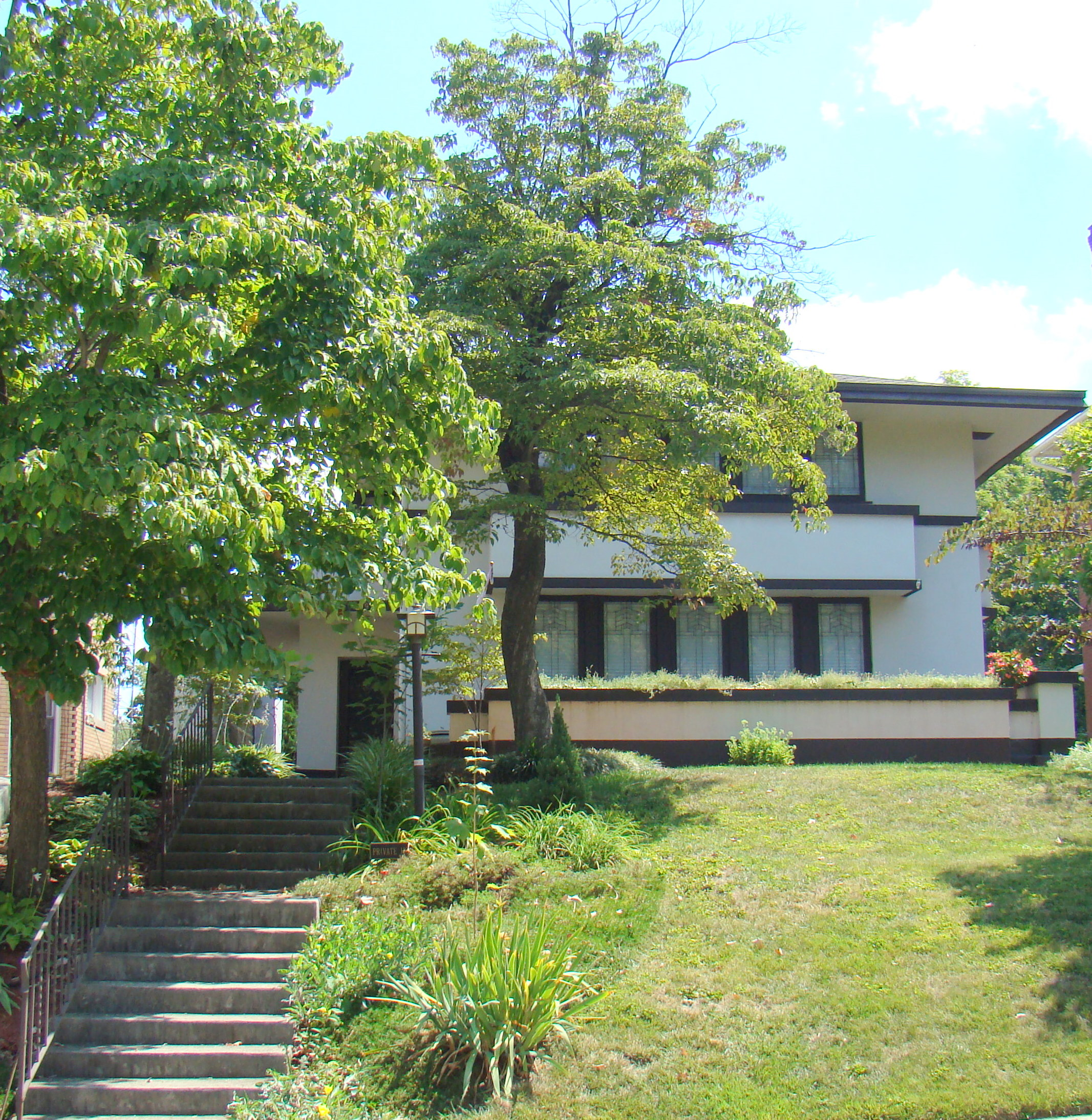
The Jesse R. Zeigler House also has a hip roof (not visible). Note the front terrace and enlarged second floor planter boxes

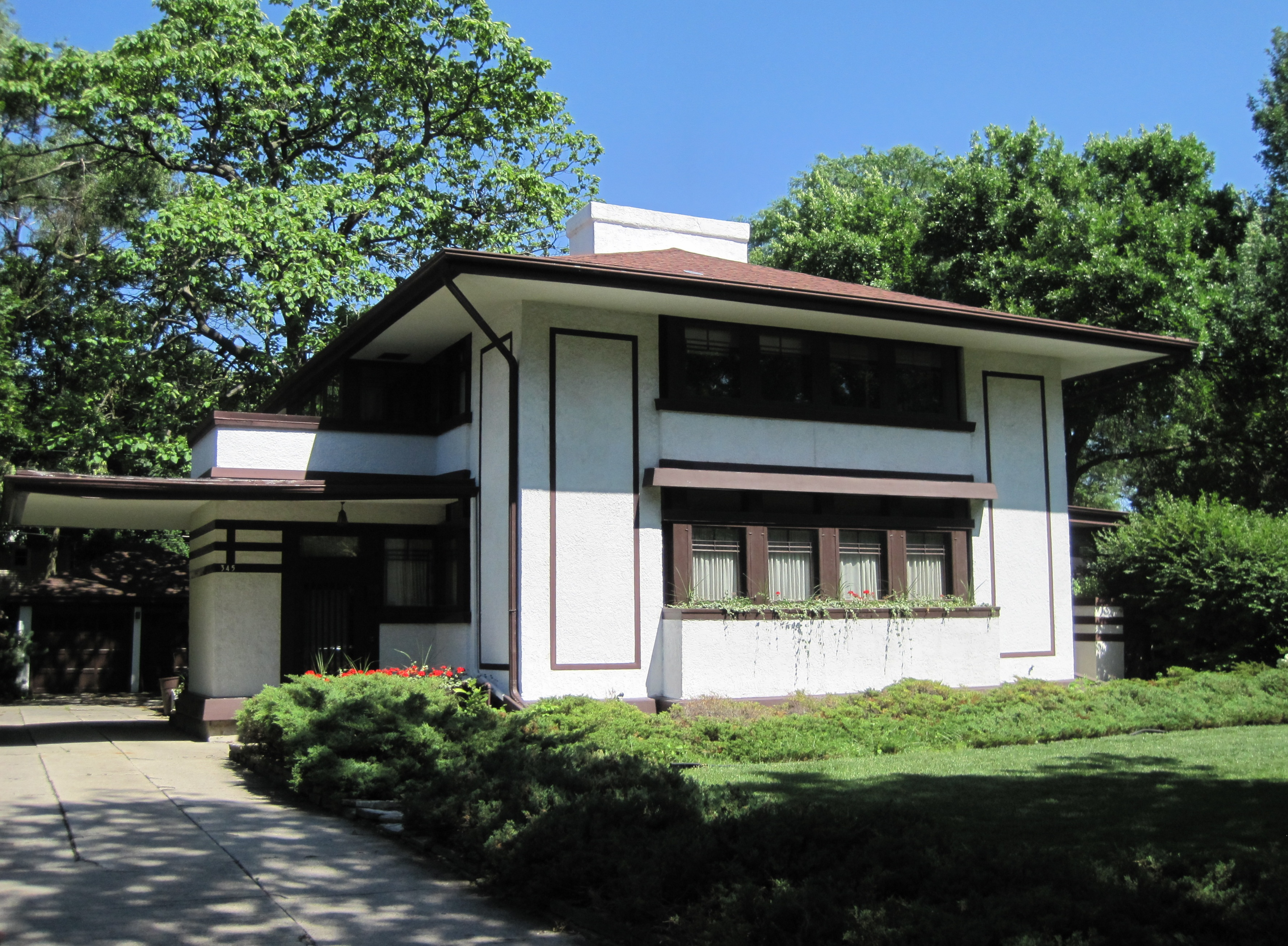
Stephen M. B. Hunt House I

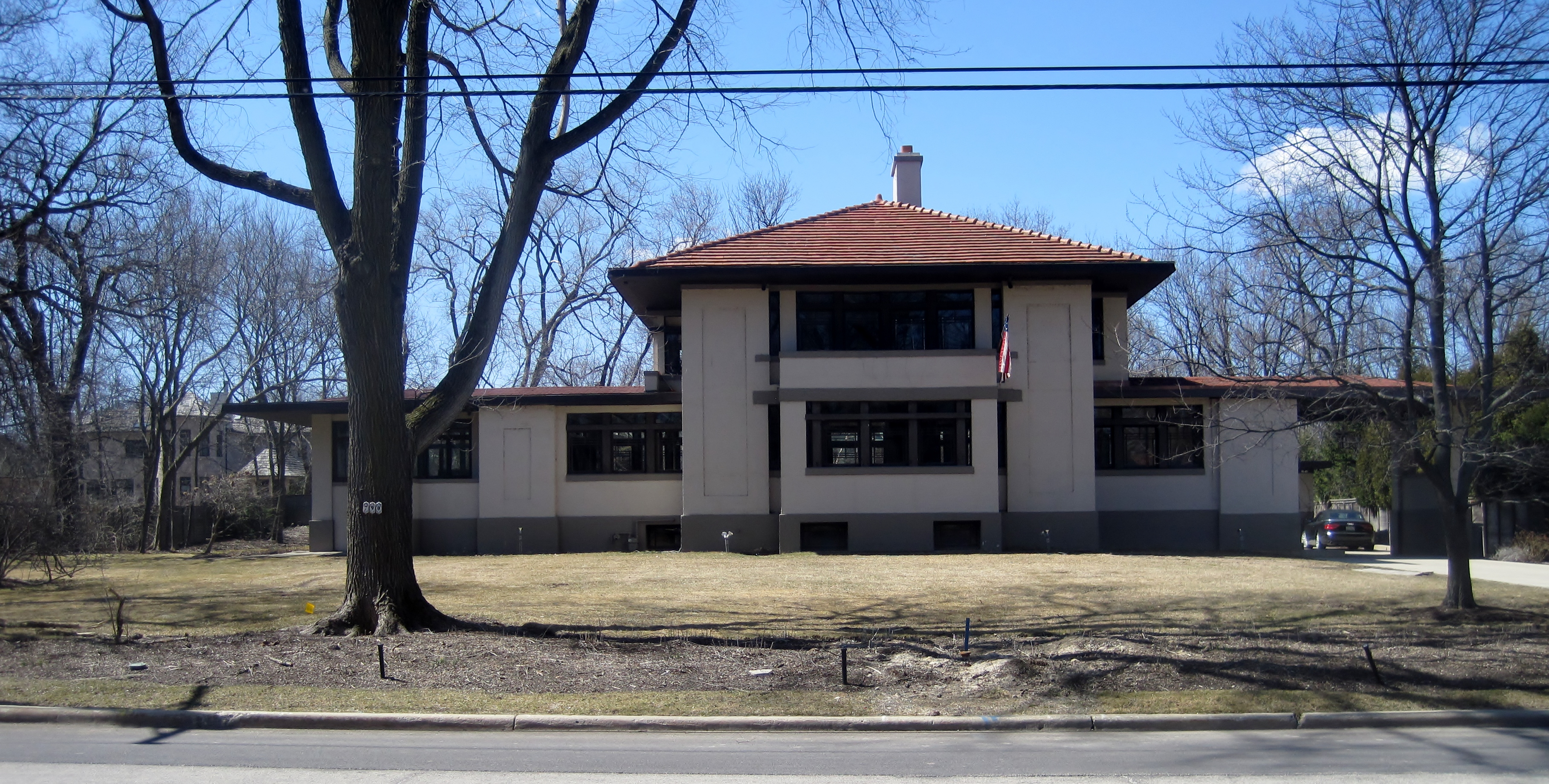
Edmund D. Brigham House

=== Variations by other architects ===
- P.F. Travers House, Mamaroneck, New York, 1907; architect: C.C. Crosley
- Gocke-Vance House, Overland, Missouri, 1910; architect: Lawrence Ewald
- Arthur Rule House (Blythe-Rule House), Mason City, Iowa, 1912–13; architect: Walter Burley Griffin
- J.G. Melson House, Mason City, Iowa, 1914; architect: Walter Burley Griffin
- Gustav Becker House, Ogden, Utah, 1915; architect: Ware & Treganza
- Lawrence Buck Residence, Marshman Ave., Highland Park, Illinois (Ravinia), Illinois – 1911; architect: Lawrence Buck
- Herbert Graf House, Knoxville, Tennessee – 1923; architect Herbert Graf of R.F. Graf & Sons

== Related designs ==
Prior to publishing "A Fireproof House", Wright designed and constructed two houses with very similar floor plans. The first was the Robert M. Lamp House (1903) in Madison, Wisconsin, followed by the Charles A. Brown House (1905) in Evanston, Illinois.

In 1909, Wright designed three compact houses for an unexecuted subdivision for Edward C. Waller with floor plans that resemble the Fireproof House and Ravine Bluff rental properties. These houses also appeared in the Wasmuth Portfolio on Plate XLVIII. He also reused the basic Foursquare layout for at least three models of his later American System-Built Homes.

== See also ==
- List of Frank Lloyd Wright works
