= Hyrum T. Covey House =

Historic house in Salt Lake City, Utah, U.S.

- U.S. National Register of Historic Places
- U.S. Historic district – Contributing property
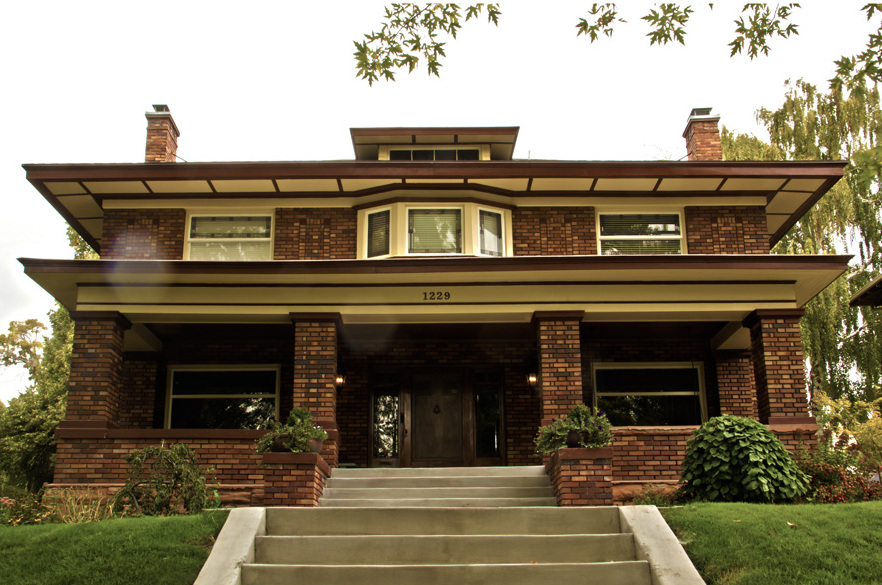
- Hyrum T. Covey House, September 2012

- Location within Utah Location within the United States
- Location: 1229 East 100 South; Salt Lake City, Utah; United States
- Coordinates: 40°46′3″N 111°51′19″W
- Area: less than one acre
- Built: 1909
- Built by: Winegar, R.J.
- Architect: Ware & Treganza
- Architectural style: Prairie School
- Part of: University Neighborhood Historic District (ID95001430)
- NRHP reference No.: 80003921

Significant dates
- Added to NRHP: October 3, 1980
- Designated CP: December 13, 1995

The Hyrum T. Covey House is a historic house in northeastern Salt Lake City, Utah, United States, that is located within the University Neighborhood Historic District, but is individually listed on the National Register of Historic Places (NRHP).

== Description ==
The house is located at 1229 East 100 South and was built in 1909. It is a "fine example" of Prairie School architecture in Utah, designed by architects Ware and Treganza.

Construction of the Almon A. Covey House (next door, at 1211 East 100 South) also began in 1909. It was also built in Prairie School style, designed by the same firm, and is also NRHP-listed.

The house was listed on the NRHP on October 3, 1980.

== Layout ==
The home is symmetrical with a square box-like quality, but with a feeling of horizontality which is typical of Prairie School style.

The exterior of the home is built almost entirely of multi-toned brown brick on a sandstone foundation. The home originally had three chimneys (one in the dining room, one in the parlor and one in the library), but two have since been closed in. A porch extends across the entire front facade of the home.

On the first floor, the entry hall is much larger in this house than is typical of Ware & Treganza homes. The stairway begins in the hallway in an "L" shape. The newel post once held a stained glass lantern with a floral motif. The second floor was reached by either the kitchen or the front stairs (however, the back stairway from the kitchen to the landing has since been blocked off). On the landing is a decorative stained glass window in an abstract floral motif. The abstract motif is typical of the Prairie School style's leaded and stained glass windows.

When the house was built, a partition divided the parlor and the library. The library was about one-third of what is now the living room.

The second floor now has three bedrooms and three bathrooms following renovations around 2010, however it originally had three bedrooms and two bathrooms. The master bedroom was located in the southwest corner with a dressing room directly to the east.

In about 1920 a sleeping porch was added.

The basement was finished in the 1990s, adding two bedrooms and an additional bathroom.

== See also ==
- National Register of Historic Places listings in Salt Lake City
