= Almon A. Covey House =

Historic house in Salt Lake City, Utah, U.S.

- U.S. National Register of Historic Places
- U.S. Historic district – Contributing property
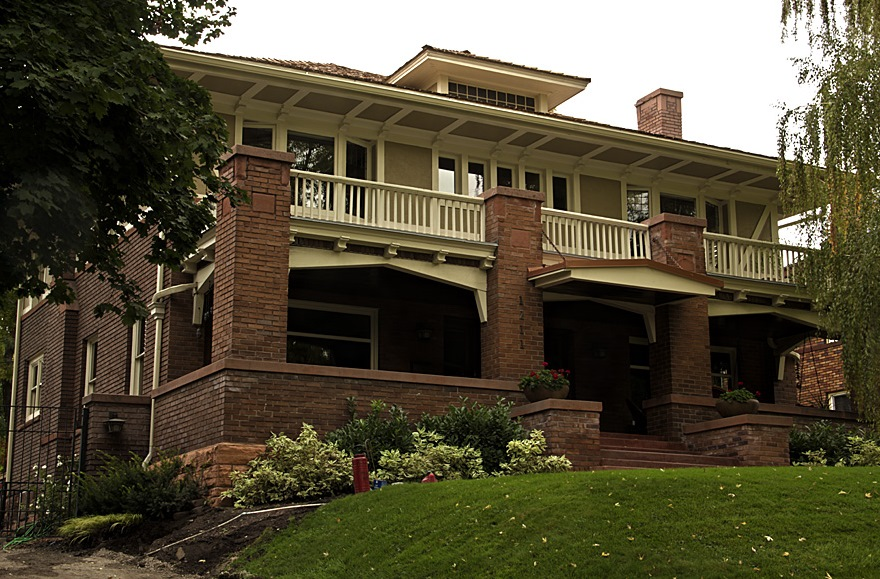
- Almon A. Covey House, September 2012

- Location within Utah Location within the United States
- Location: 1211 East 100 South; Salt Lake City, Utah; United States
- Coordinates: 40°46′3″N 111°51′21″W
- Area: less than one acre
- Built: 1909
- Built by: R. J. Winegar
- Architect: Ware & Treganza
- Architectural style: Prairie School
- Part of: University Neighborhood Historic District (ID95001430)
- NRHP reference No.: 80003920

Significant dates
- Added to NRHP: October 3, 1980
- Designated CP: December 13, 1995

The Almon A. Covey House is a historic house in northeastern Salt Lake City, Utah, United States, that is located within the University Neighborhood Historic District, but is individually listed on the National Register of Historic Places (NRHP).

== Description ==
The house is located at 1211 East 100 South. It is a 2 1/2-story, Prairie School-style house, designed by architecture firm Ware & Treganza. Construction commenced in 1909. According to the NRHP nomination, it is significant as a "fine example" of Prairie School style in Utah. It is probably one of the earliest examples of Prairie School style in the work of Ware & Treganza.

Construction of the Hyrum T. Covey House (next door, at 1229 East 100 South) also began in 1909. It was also built in Prairie School style, designed by the same firm, and is also NRHP-listed.

The house was listed on the NRHP on October 3, 1980.

== See also ==
- National Register of Historic Places listings in Salt Lake City
