= Gustav Becker House =

Historic house in Utah, United States

- U.S. National Register of Historic Places
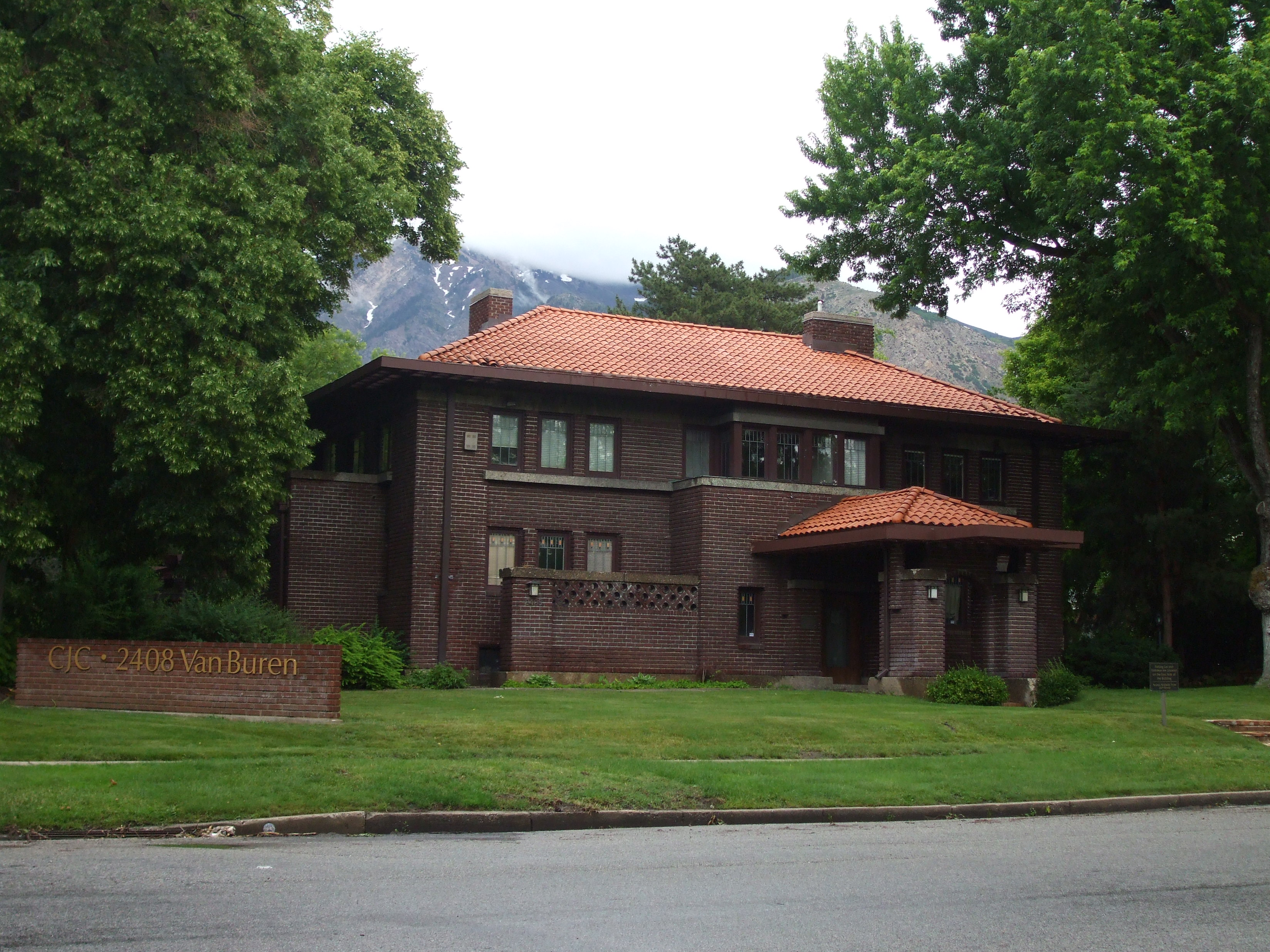
- The house as of 2009

- Location within Utah Location within the United States
- Location: 2408 Van Buren Ave., Ogden, Utah
- Coordinates: 41°13′21″N 111°57′0″W
- Area: less than one acre
- Built: 1915
- Architect: Ware & Treganza
- Architectural style: Prairie School
- NRHP reference No.: 77001327
- Added to NRHP: July 21, 1977

The Gustav Becker House is located at 2408 Van Buren Avenue, in Ogden, Utah, United States. It was built around 1915 based on Frank Lloyd Wright's "A Fireproof House for $5,000" published in Ladies' Home Journal in April 1907. It was designed in detail by Salt Lake architects Ware & Treganza.

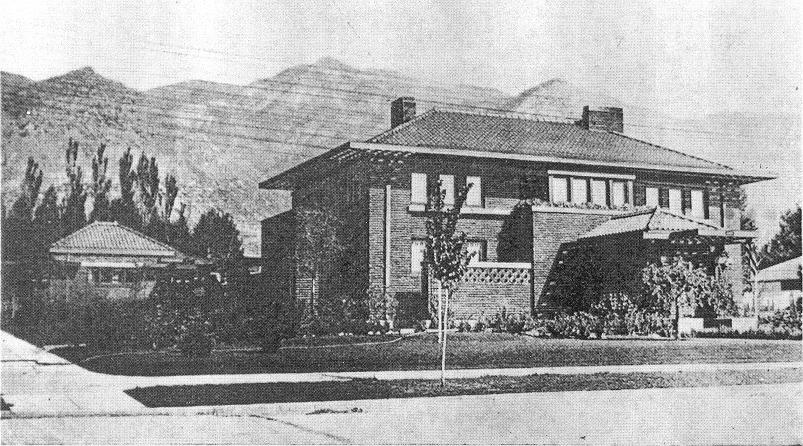

== See also ==
- List of Frank Lloyd Wright works
