= Robert M. Lamp Cottage =

Former cottage in Madison, Wisconsin

Coordinates: 43.125176°N 89.4032285°W

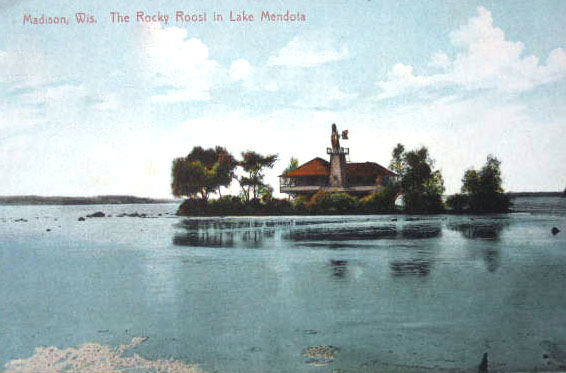
- Rocky Roost
- Interactive map of the Robert M. Lamp Cottage area

General information
- Location: Lake Mendota, Madison, Wisconsin

Design and construction
- Architect: Frank Lloyd Wright

The Robert M. Lamp Cottage, also known as Rocky Roost, was a summer cottage on a small island on Lake Mendota in Madison, Wisconsin. The cottage was designed by architect Frank Lloyd Wright for a boyhood friend, Robert M. Lamp (1866–1916), for whom Wright also designed the Lamp House in Madison.

There was a cottage on the island by 1893, and there is some disagreement as to whether Wright had something to do with its construction. By the turn of the century several cottages had been constructed on the small island, and it is known that in 1901–02 Wright tied the cottages together into one structure, which is the cottage for Robert Lamp that appears in postcards and photographs. The cottage was a two-story building with horizontal siding and a wrap-around porch on the second floor. In 1902–03, a windmill was added on the island to bring water to the cottage.

Evidence points toward the cottage burning in late 1934 to early 1935. According to Wright scholar John O. Holzheuter in "Frank Lloyd Wright designs for Robert Lamp":

A search of newspapers and fire department records for Waunakee (the department that technically should have taken the call) proved fruitless for establishing a date ... Because no taxes were paid on the building for 1935, it can be deduced that the fire occurred after May 15, 1934 and before May 15, 1935.

No physical evidence of the cottage or windmill remains.

== See also ==
- List of Frank Lloyd Wright works
