= Springville Carnegie Library =

- U.S. National Register of Historic Places
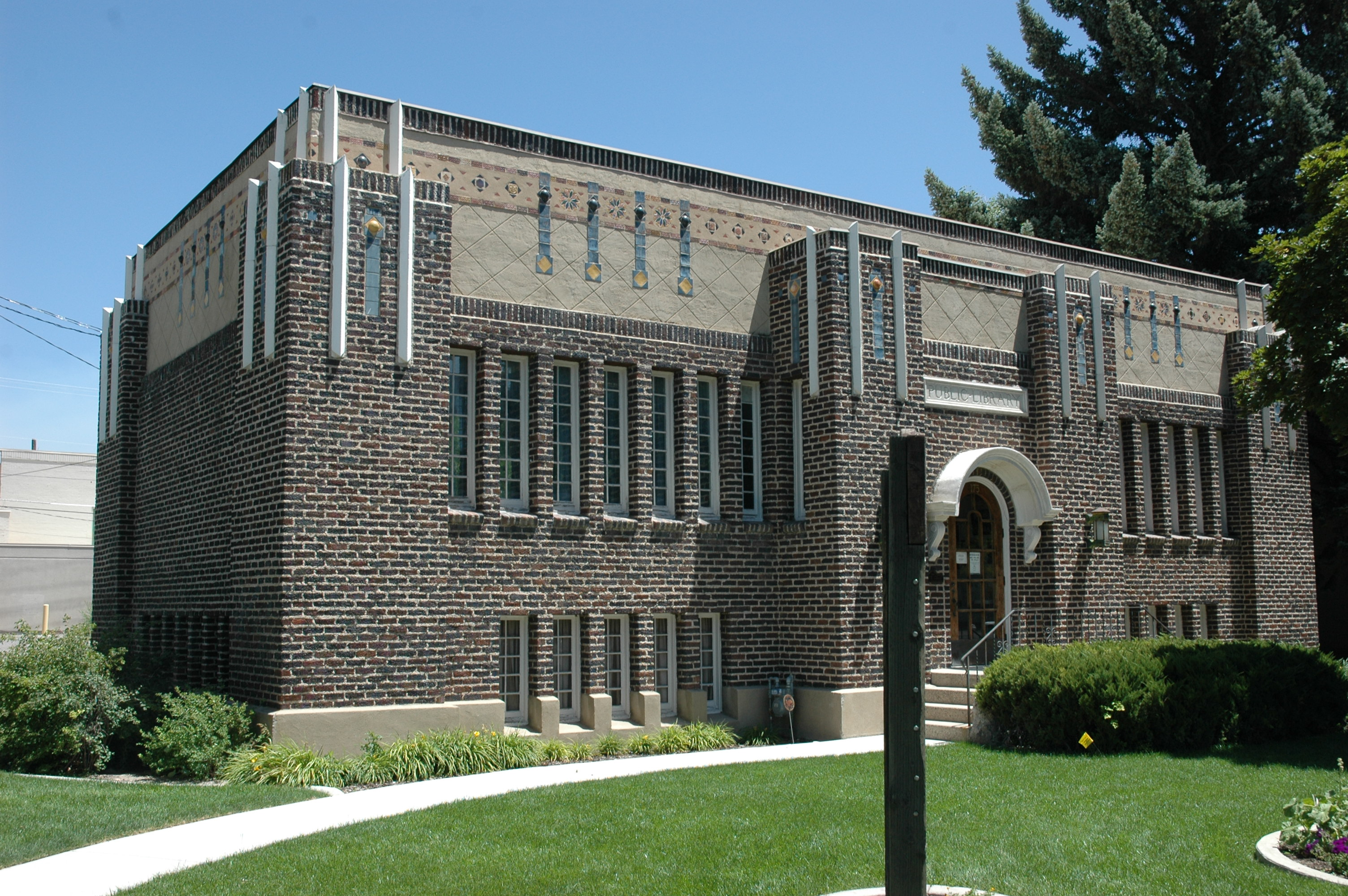
- Springville Carnegie Library, June 2012

- Location within Utah Location within the United States
- Location: 175 South Main Street; Springville, Utah; United States
- Coordinates: 40°9′51″N 111°36′36″W
- Area: 0.1 acres (0.040 ha)
- Built: 1922
- Architect: Ware & Treganza
- Architectural style: Prairie School
- MPS: Carnegie Library TR
- NRHP reference No.: 91001821
- Added to NRHP: December 13, 1991

The Springville Carnegie Library at 175 South Main Street in Springville, Utah, United States is a Prairie School style Carnegie library building completed in 1922. It is one of the 23 Carnegie Libraries that were built in Utah. It functioned as the city public library until 1965, when the library was moved to a new larger building (which in turn was replaced and later demolished in the mid-2010s). The 1922 building was listed on the National Register of Historic Places in 1991. It now houses a pioneer relic museum for the Daughters of the Utah Pioneers.

== Physical Appearance ==
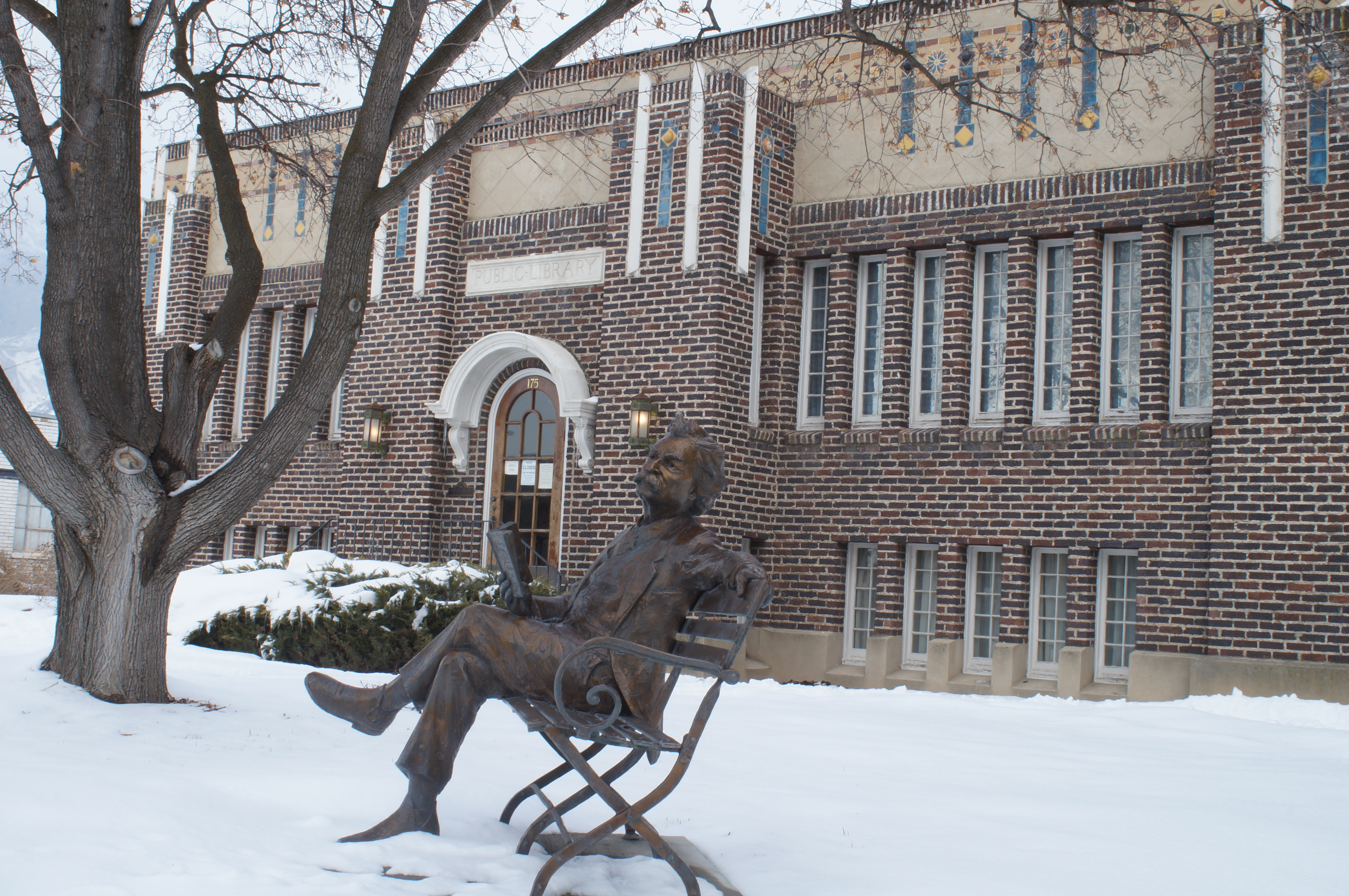
The Mark Twain statue in front of the former library, February 2013

The National Register of Historic Places Registration Form describes the building as building that follows the Carnegie Library standards. The building is generally characterized by Prairie style architecture, most notably seen in the tall, vertical windows arranged in a strong horizontal band on both the main and lower levels. However, the main entry is characterized by its classical influences including the rounded top main door capped by a semi-circular pre-cast concrete hood with decorative scroll brackets on both sides.

The library is rectangular in shape and one-and-one-half stories in height. The exterior consists of textured bricks and is capped by a horizontal band of stucco decorated in ceramic tile mosaics. This stucco also characterized by a brick soldier course at the top and bottom.

Large masonry piers interrupt at all four corners of the building as well as at the main entry. They divide the main facade into three symmetrical parts.

In the 1970s, an imitation mansard roof was added and this greatly altered its appearance. This addition rendered the Springville Carnegie Library ineligible for recognition by the National Register of Historic Places. Since then, the mansard roof was removed, which restored the building to its original appearance. It is now currently eligible.

The last modification to the exterior of the building was the replacement of a three-foot-tall brick railing wall at the main entry by a cast-iron railing.

== See also ==
- List of Carnegie libraries in Utah
- National Register of Historic Places listings in Utah County, Utah
