= Ware & Treganza =

American architectural firm

Ware & Treganza was a leading American architectural firm in the intermountain west during the late 19th and early 20th century. It was a partnership of Walter E. Ware and Alberto O. Treganza and operated in Salt Lake City, Utah.

They designed civic buildings, churches and homes, many of which are in Prairie School style and are listed on the U.S. National Register of Historic Places. Ware & Treganza also offered training to many other architects including Taylor Woolley, Leslie S. Hodgson, and Georgious Y. Cannon.

== History ==
The firm was established in Salt Lake City, Utah in 1891 by Walter E. Ware. Alberto O. Treganza joined the firm in 1901, establishing Ware & Treganza.

== Images of selected works ==
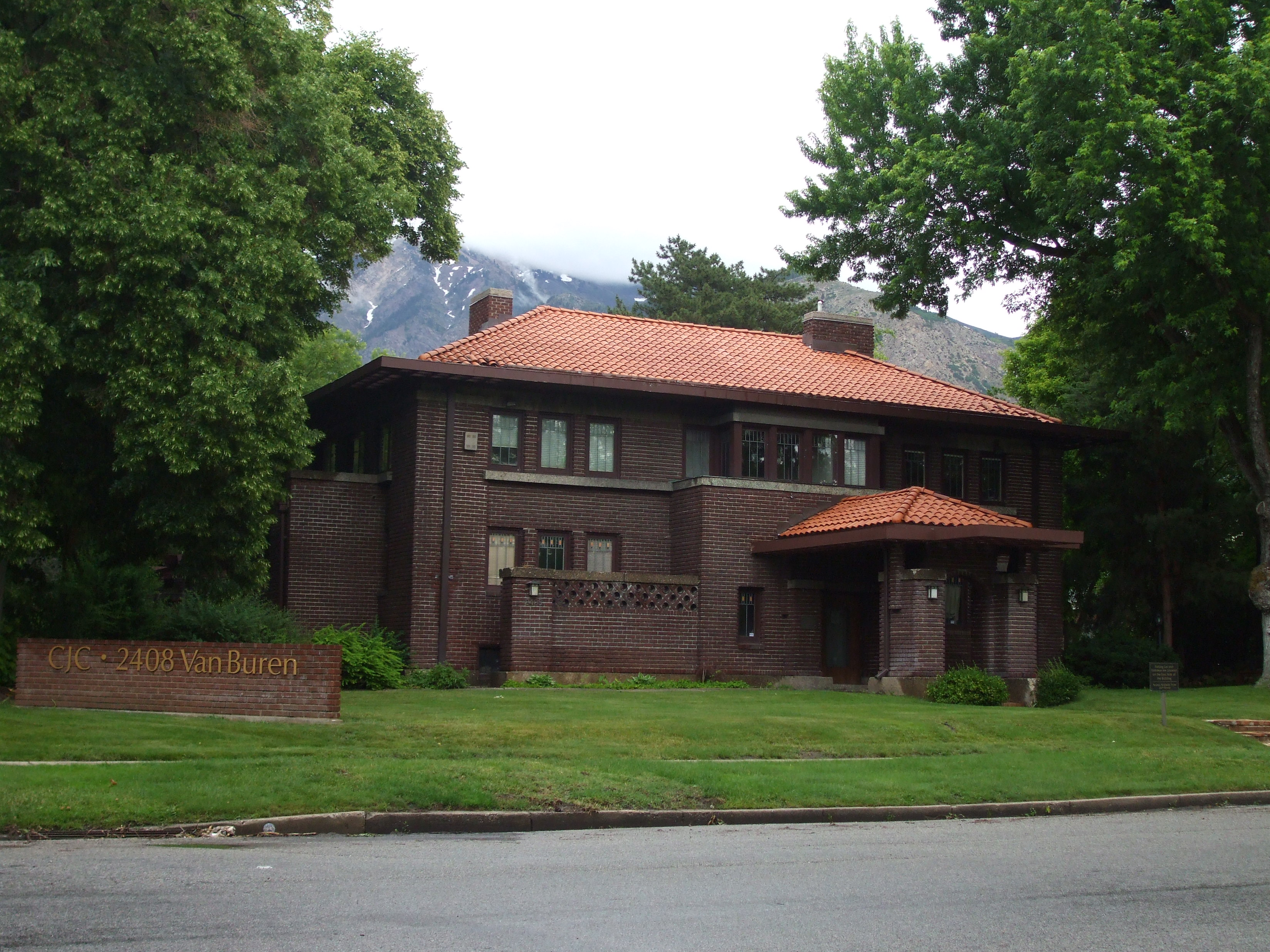
Gustav Becker House (1915) *NRHP listed

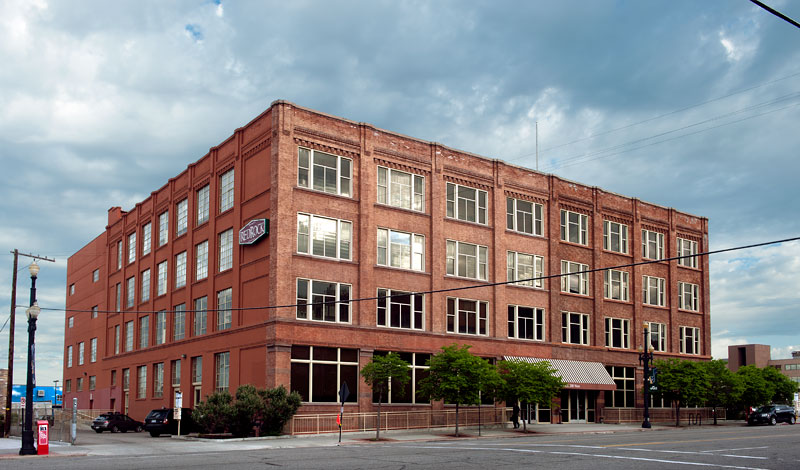
Sweet Candy Company Building *NRHP listed

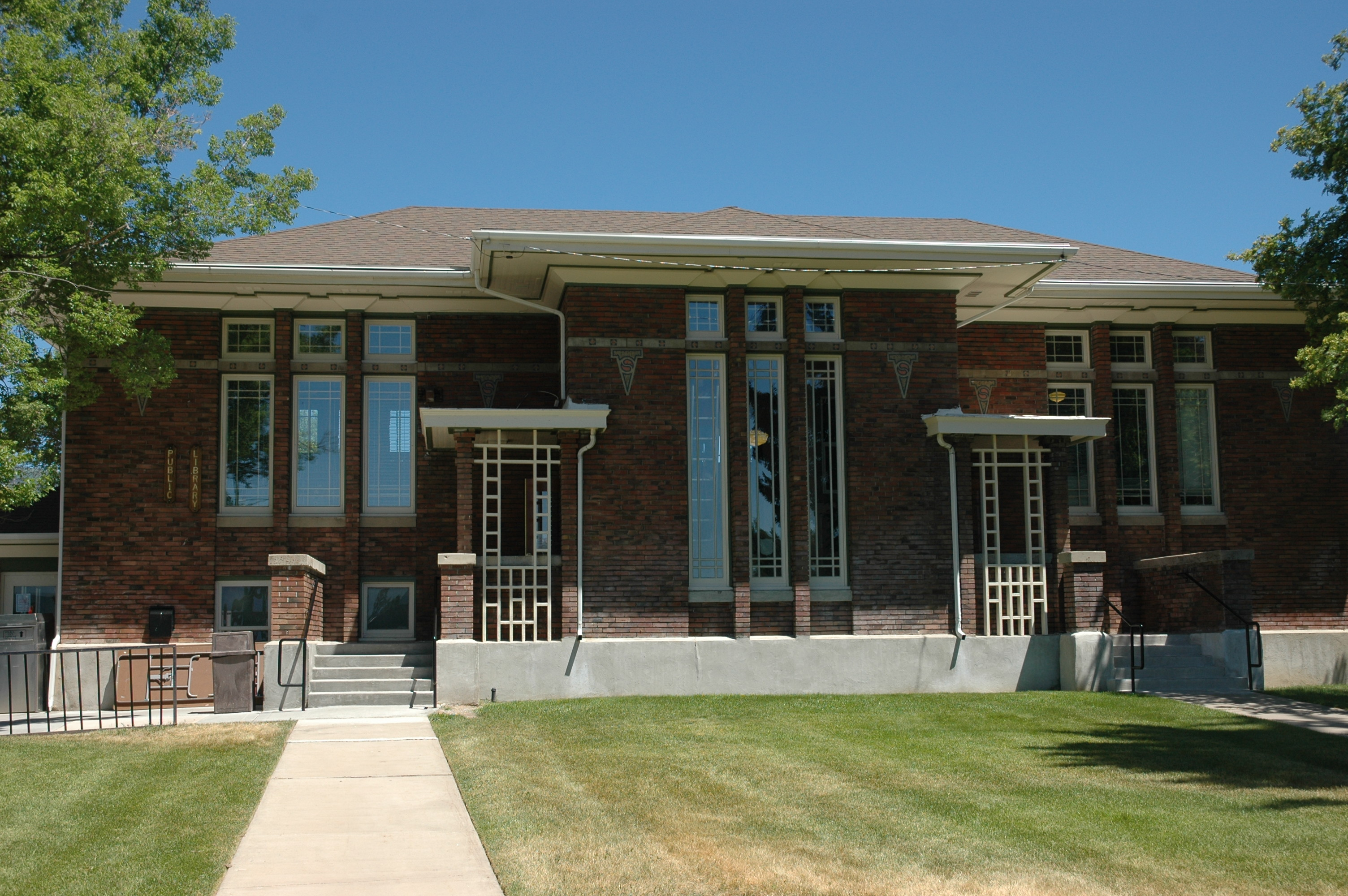
Mount Pleasant Carnegie Library (1917) *NRHP listed

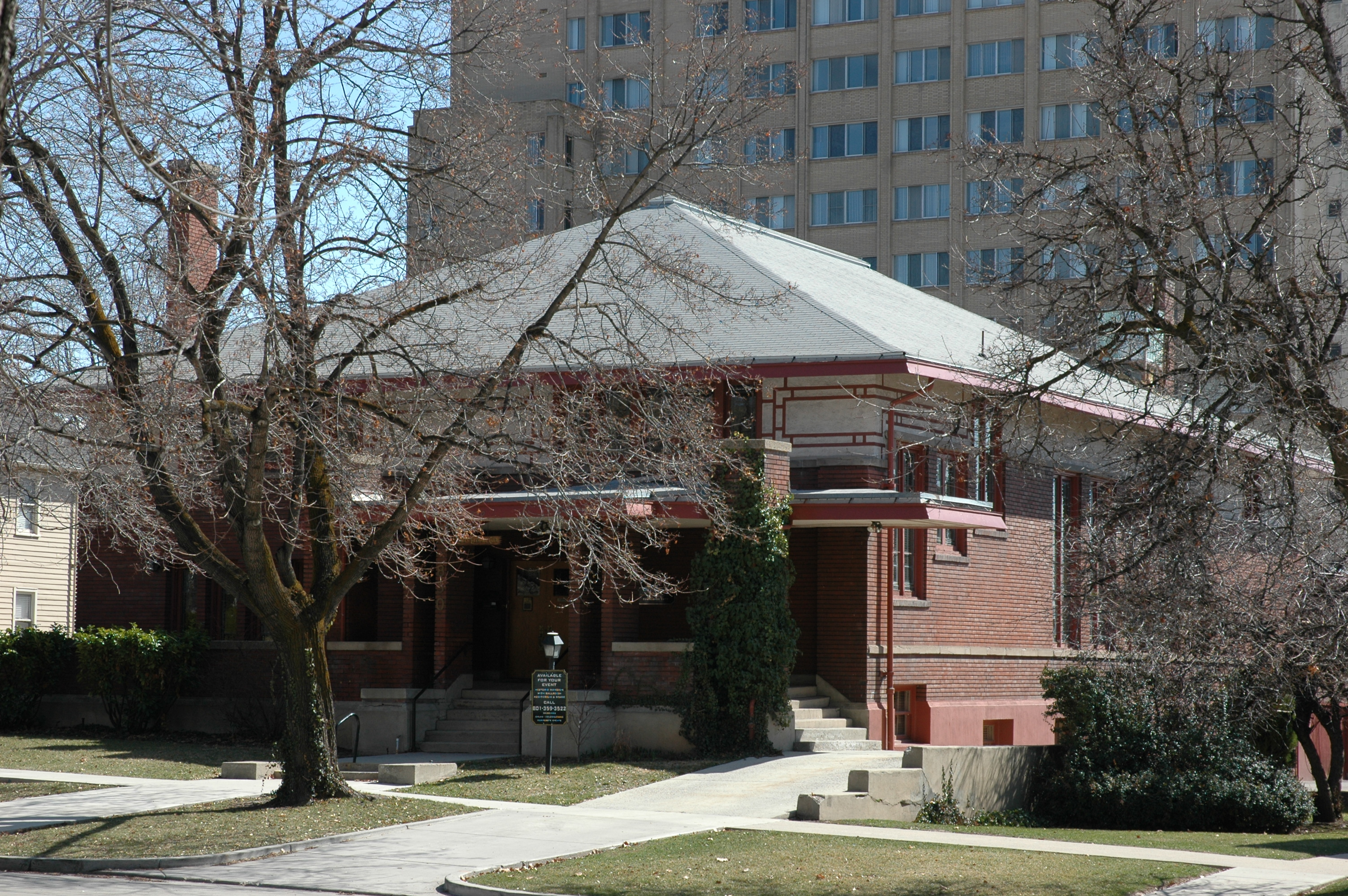
Ladies Literary Club Clubhouse *NRHP listed

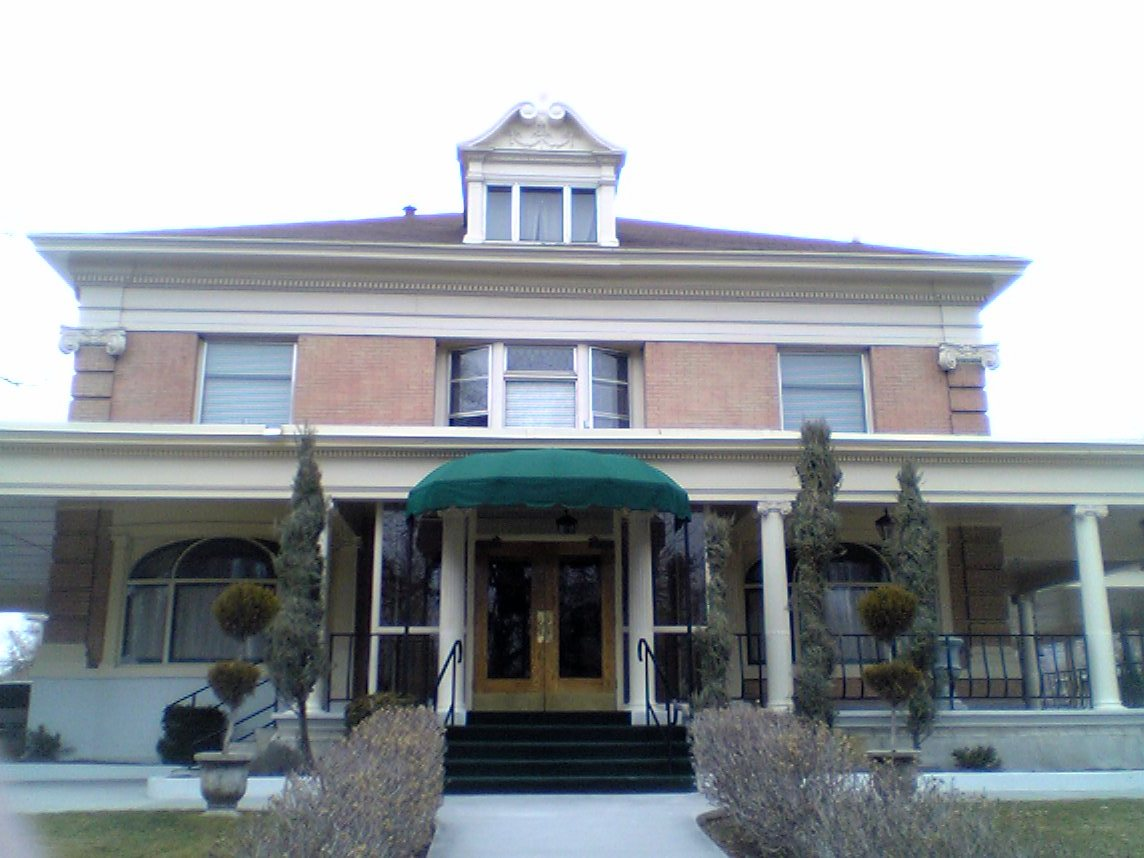
Jesse Knight House (1905)*NRHP listed

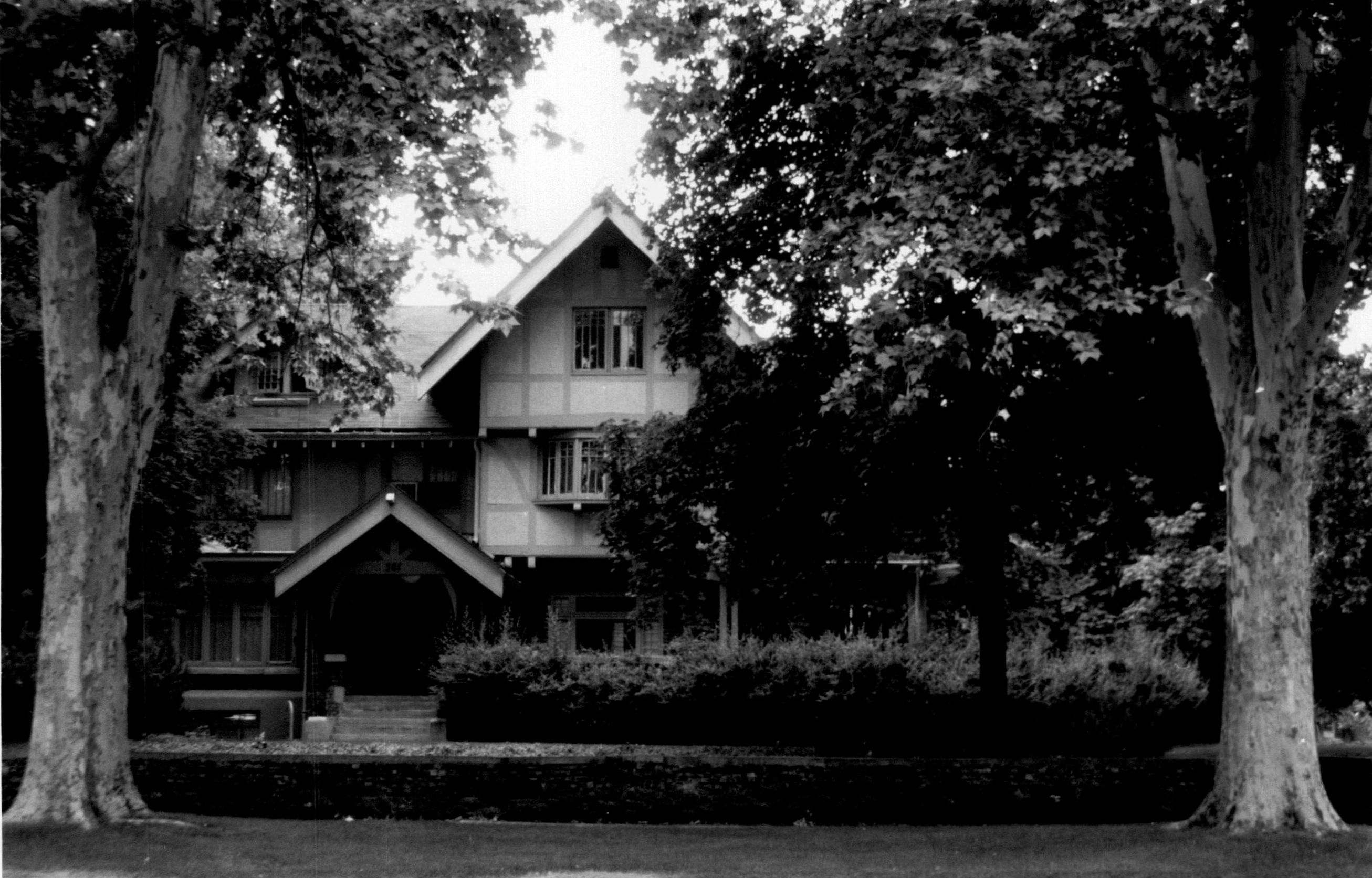
Knight-Mangum House (1908)*NRHP listed

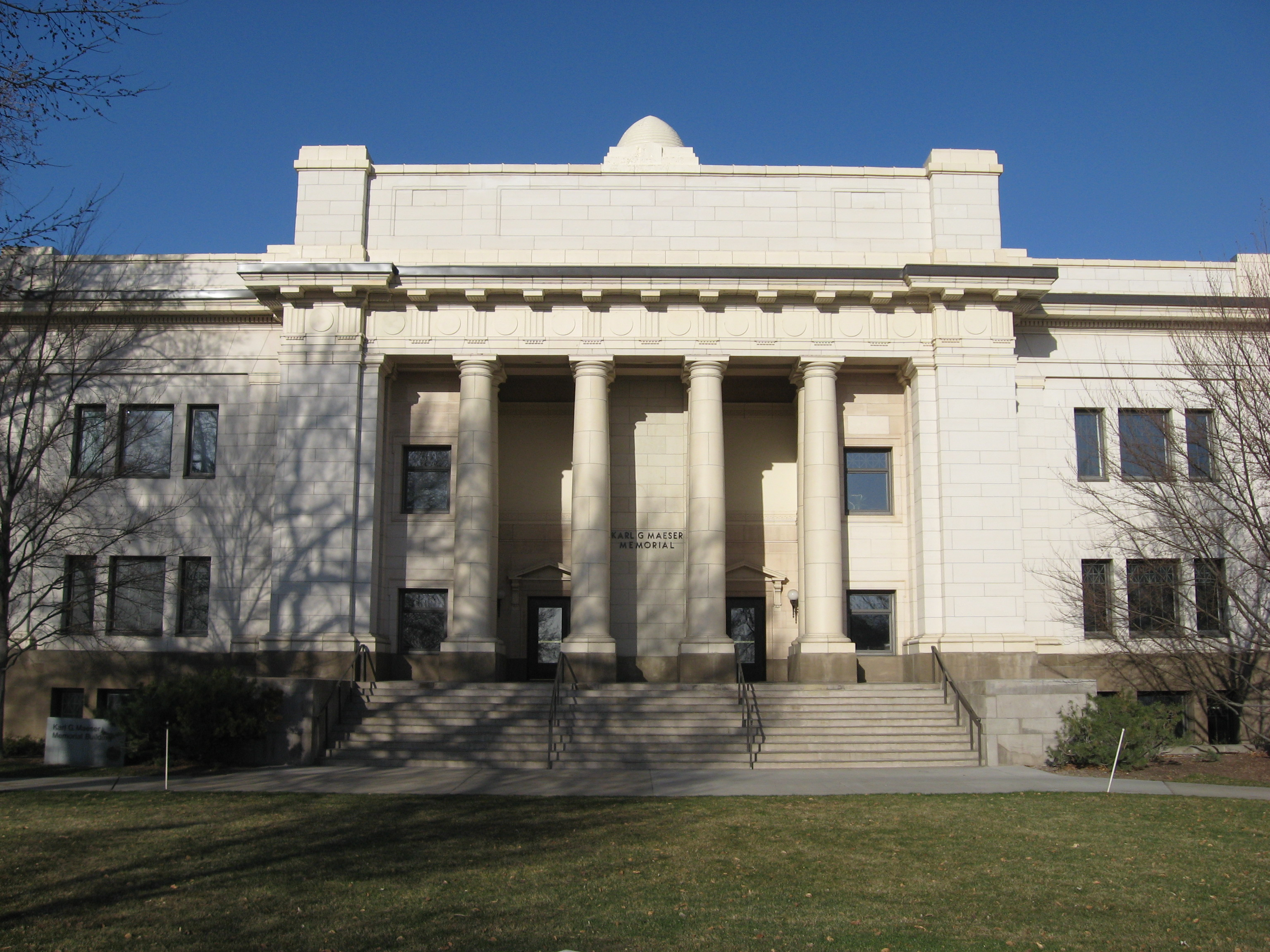
Maeser Building (1911)

== Other works ==
- Almon A. Covey House, 1211 E. 100 South, Salt Lake City, UT *NRHP listed
- Converse Hall (Westminster College), 1840 S. 13th East, Salt Lake City, UT *NRHP listed
- Hyrum T. Covey House, 1229 E. 100 South, Salt Lake City, UT *NRHP listed
- Green River Presbyterian Church, 134 W. Third Ave., Green River, UT *NRHP listed
- Park Hotel, 422-432 W. 300 South, Salt Lake City, UT *NRHP listed
- Smith Apartments, 228 S. 300 East, Salt Lake City, UT *NRHP listed
- Springville Carnegie Library, 175 S. Main St., Springville, UT *NRHP listed
- One or more works in Utah State Fair Grounds, Salt Lake City, UT *NRHP listed
- One or more works in University Neighborhood Historic District, Roughly bounded by 500 S., S. Temple, 100 E. and University St., Salt Lake City, UT *NRHP listed
- 17th Ward Chapel (demolished)
- Samuel C. Sherrill House
- Dr. Samuel H. Allen House
- Caithness Apartments
- Murphy House
- Frank M. Cameron House
- B.B. Grey House
