= Sweet Candy Company Building =

Building in Salt Lake City, Utah, U.S.

- U.S. National Register of Historic Places
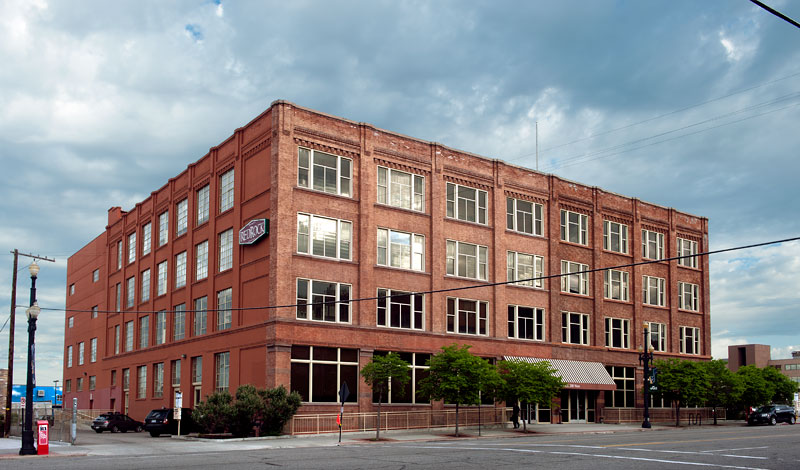

- Location within Utah Location within the United States
- Location: 224 South 200 West, Salt Lake City, Utah
- Coordinates: 40°45′52″N 111°53′48″W
- Area: 1.2 acres (0.49 ha)
- Built: 1911
- Architect: Walter Ware; Alberto Treganza
- Architectural style: Early Commercial
- MPS: Salt Lake City Business District MRA
- NRHP reference No.: 00001584
- Added to NRHP: December 28, 2000

The Sweet Candy Company Building was built in 1911 at 224 South 200 West in Salt Lake City, Utah, and expanded in 1922. Its original building, now the northern portion, was designed by Ware & Treganza in Early Commercial architecture. The 1922 expansion doubled the size of the combined property.

It is historically significant for its association with the candy industry in Utah, and was built when the industry was automating. It is also significant for representing the commercial work of architects Ware & Treganza who are known mostly for their governmental and residential works.

It was listed on the National Register of Historic Places in 2000.
