= Mount Pleasant Carnegie Library =

- U.S. National Register of Historic Places
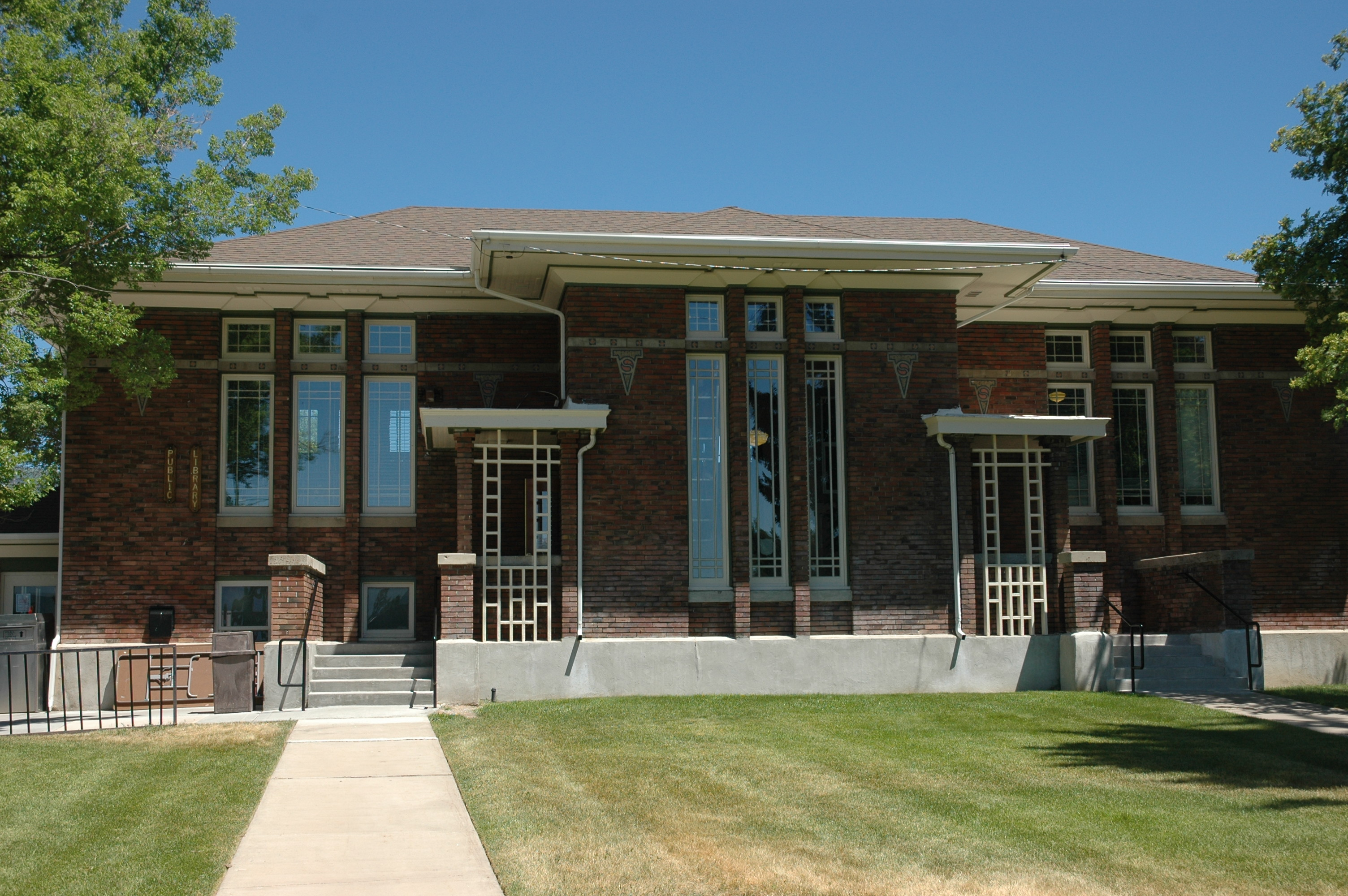
- Location: 24 E. Main St., Mount Pleasant, Utah
- Coordinates: 39°32′48″N 111°27′14″W
- Area: less than one acre
- Built: 1917
- Built by: Bent R. Hansen, August Larsen, and John Stansfield
- Architect: Ware & Treganza
- Architectural style: Prairie School
- MPS: Carnegie Library TR
- NRHP reference No.: 84000152
- Added to NRHP: October 25, 1984

The Mount Pleasant Carnegie Library, at 24 E. Main St. in Mount Pleasant, Utah, was built as a Carnegie library in 1917. It was listed on the National Register of Historic Places in 1984.

It was designed by architects Ware & Treganza in Prairie School style.

It is the only Carnegie library without a centered front door; consistent with Prairie Style the entrance is instead indirect, in this case through sides of a bay projecting to the front.

It was built by local contractors Bent R. Hansen, August Larsen, and John Stansfield.
