= Robert M. Lamp House =

Historic house in Wisconsin, United States

- U.S. National Register of Historic Places
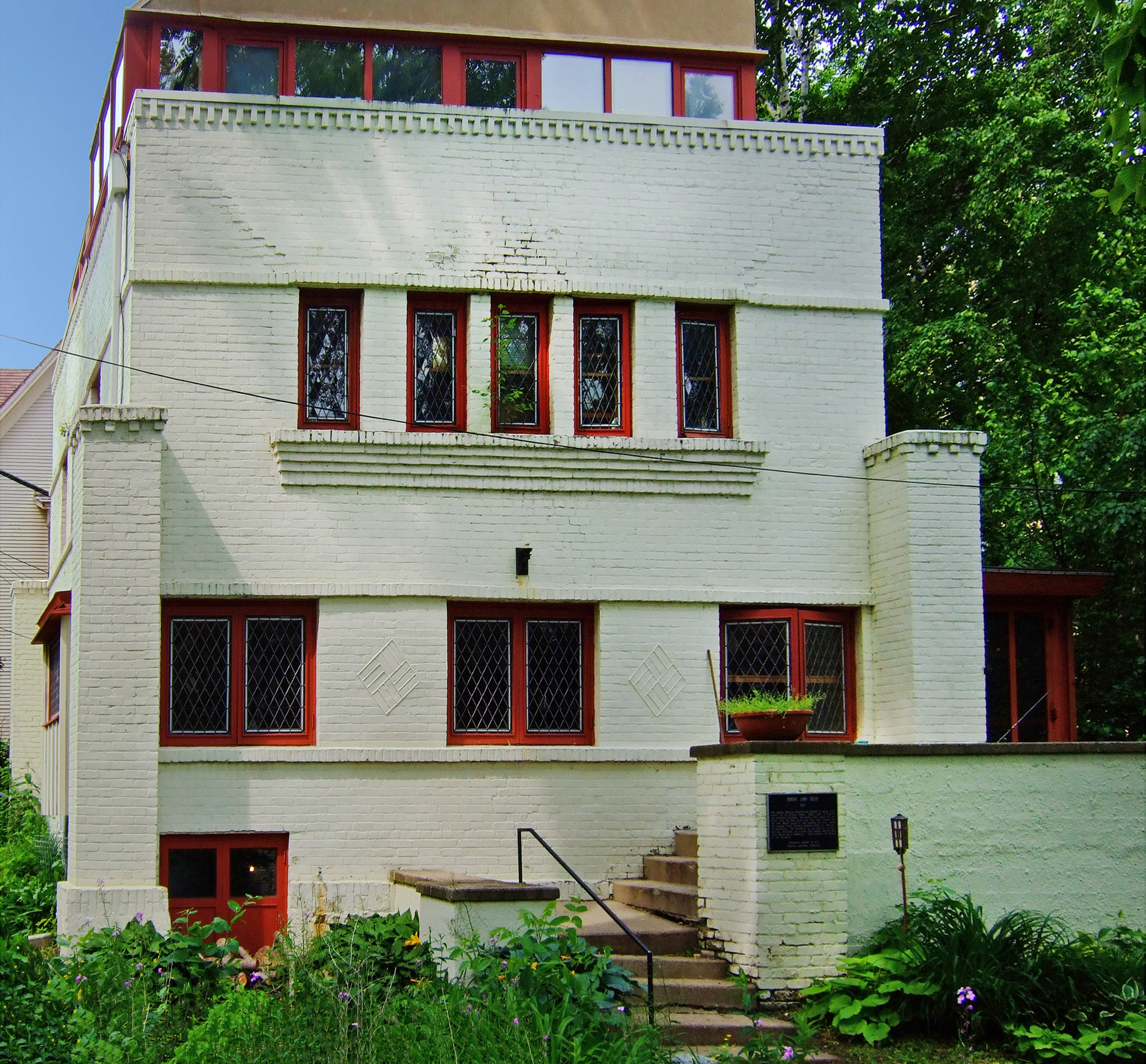
- The Lamp House viewed from the east

- Location within Wisconsin
- Location: 22 N. Butler St, Madison, Wisconsin
- Coordinates: 43°4′37.14″N 89°22′57.1″W
- Built: 1903
- Architect: Frank Lloyd Wright
- Architectural style: Chicago School, Prairie School
- NRHP reference No.: 78000089
- Added to NRHP: 1978-01-03

The Robert M. Lamp House is a residence built in 1903 two blocks northeast of the Wisconsin State Capitol in Madison, Wisconsin, designed by Frank Lloyd Wright for his lifelong friend "Robie" Lamp, a realtor, insurance agent, and Madison City Treasurer. The oldest Wright-designed house in Madison, its style is transitional between Chicago School and Prairie School. In 1978 the house was added to the National Register of Historic Places.

== "Robie" Lamp ==
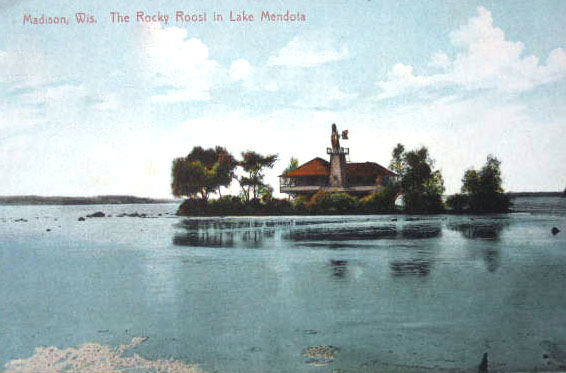
Rocky Roost

Lamp (1866–1916) lived here with his parents and an aunt until their deaths, and later with his wife and stepson. He selected this location near the Capitol Square because of its proximity to his office on Pinckney Street. Both he and Wright had the same birthday (June 8), exactly one year apart. Following a schoolyard fight in 1879, they became boyhood friends. By 1893, Wright had designed for Lamp a lakefront cottage and boat landing in Lake Mendota, Rocky Roost, destroyed by fire in 1934). Ten years after that, Lamp asked Wright to design a house for him. Both projects occupied unremarkable locations, sites developed virtually out of nothing.

== Site and surroundings ==
The Lamp House has a mid-block location, a siting unique among Wright's works. Bounded by East Washington Avenue and by Mifflin, Webster, and Butler Streets, it is accessible only from Butler Street via a narrow, ascending driveway on a right-of-way between two houses. The "keyhole" lot then opens up, producing a compression and release dynamic encountered frequently in Wright's works. This telescoping effect contributes to the monumental impression made by the house, which is further heightened by two flights of poured concrete steps, so that the visitor approaches the house through a three-stage mount from driveway to front facade—a layout shared, for example, by Wright's Westcott House in Ohio, built five years later. It is also characteristic of Wright's design that the entrance door is not visible as one approaches the house but is out of sight, around the corner on the north side, which has a paved veranda the full length of the house.

Despite its downtown location, the Lamp House has a secluded feel because of its mid-block site. In addition to laying out the driveway and steps leading up to the eastern side of the house as well as the veranda on its north side, Wright hardscaped the lot with urns (now missing), curbs, and concrete-capped rubblestone retaining walls to develop an extensive yard and garden, sculpting what had originally been a steeply sloped lot into a cascading, multi-tiered landscape. The basement receives sufficient sunlight from a window on the eastern facade to overwinter tender garden plants in containers.

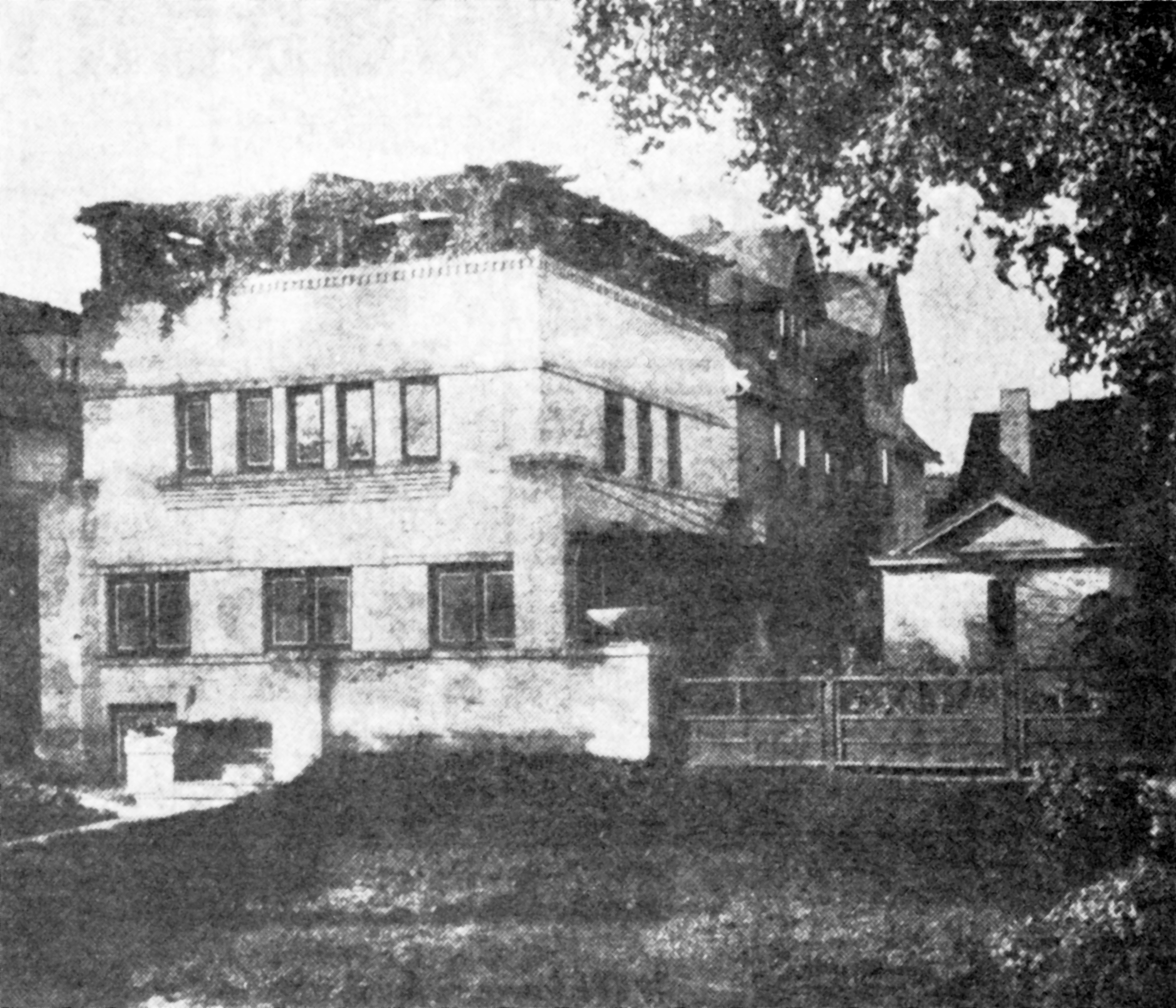
The Lamp House originally had a trellised side fence and a roof garden pergola, as shown here in a ca. 1910 photo published later in the Wisconsin State Journal.

The rooftop served Lamp, a skilled oarsman himself, as a viewing platform on which he could use binoculars to watch boaters on Lake Mendota to the north and Lake Monona to the south. Although completely landlocked, the Lamp House originally provided a viewscape in many ways comparable to that of a lakefront residence. It has always been surrounded on all four sides by residential buildings, and although the southern viewshed toward Lake Monona has been cut off by a high-rise on an adjacent lot and the westward view toward the Capitol was blocked by new construction in 2015, the penthouse enclosure later added on the Lamp House roof still has a view of Lake Mendota over the ensemble of 19th- and early 20th-century buildings to the immediate north and west.

== Architecture and floor plan ==
The simple, boxy shape of the Lamp House was quite modern for its time and stands as a precursor of Wright's breakthrough to abstraction by 1905. Together with the contemporaneous Dana–Thomas and William E. Martin Houses, it marks a transition between the styles of the Chicago School and the Prairie School. Contemporaries dubbed it "New American" in design, while the casement windows were "Old English" in inspiration. Some elements, including the fussy, diamond-shaped ornamentation in the brickwork and the truncated corner piers rising to the height of the second-story window sills, have been attributed to Wright's draftsman Walter Burley Griffin. Massive corner piers are a hallmark of Wright's nearly contemporaneous Larkin Building (1904) in Buffalo, New York. The exterior walls are constructed not of house brick but of cream-colored commercial brick, which Wright also used for his own home (1895) and studio (1898) in Oak Park, Illinois. The Lamp House's diamond-paned windows with frames painted a dark brownish red also echo those of Wright's Oak Park home and studio, which Lamp visited many times. At some time after Lamp's death, the building was painted white.

A small vestibule opens into a large, rectangular living room occupying the entire eastern half of the ground floor, while the western side has a dining room open to the living room and a kitchen separated from the dining room by a staircase to the second and third floors. Within the living room, a triangular-shaped brick-lain fireplace apron—a feature shared by the nearly contemporaneous Hillside Home School near Spring Green, Wisconsin—is positioned at the center of the house rather than at the more traditional location of an exterior wall. A flight of stairs between dining room and kitchen leads to the second floor, where four bedrooms and a bathroom are connected by a central hallway positioned directly above the fireplace downstairs—the flue is divided and diverted up through the walls of the hallway.

The stairway continues up to the roof level, which until 2015 afforded a southern view of the nearby State Capitol (its second iteration was destroyed by fire in 1904) and originally featured an elegant roof garden complete with a greenhouse and a grape arbor grown on a pergola (deconstructed in the 1960s) that was open to south. The roof garden, which anticipates many later designs by Walter Burley Griffin, gave the house something of a japonesque air.

== Context in Wright's architecture ==
The square, "open" floor plan without a wall between living room and dining room devised by Walter Burley Griffin for the Lamp House would become a standard in the following years, reused in no fewer than 25 of Wright's later projects, including the Barton House (1903–04) in Buffalo, New York, and adapted by Prairie School architects in numerous other projects. Wright adapted it in a plan he published in 1907, titled "A Fireproof House for $5000", which became one of the exemplary modern residential floor plans of the period up to about 1920. Deficiencies in the exterior design of the Lamp House, such as the patterned brickwork, are probably attributable to the haste with which the project moved from commission to completion. Wright ordered working drawings to be made before a final version was put to paper. The Lamp House nonetheless has great significance in the history of both Wright's and Griffin's development.

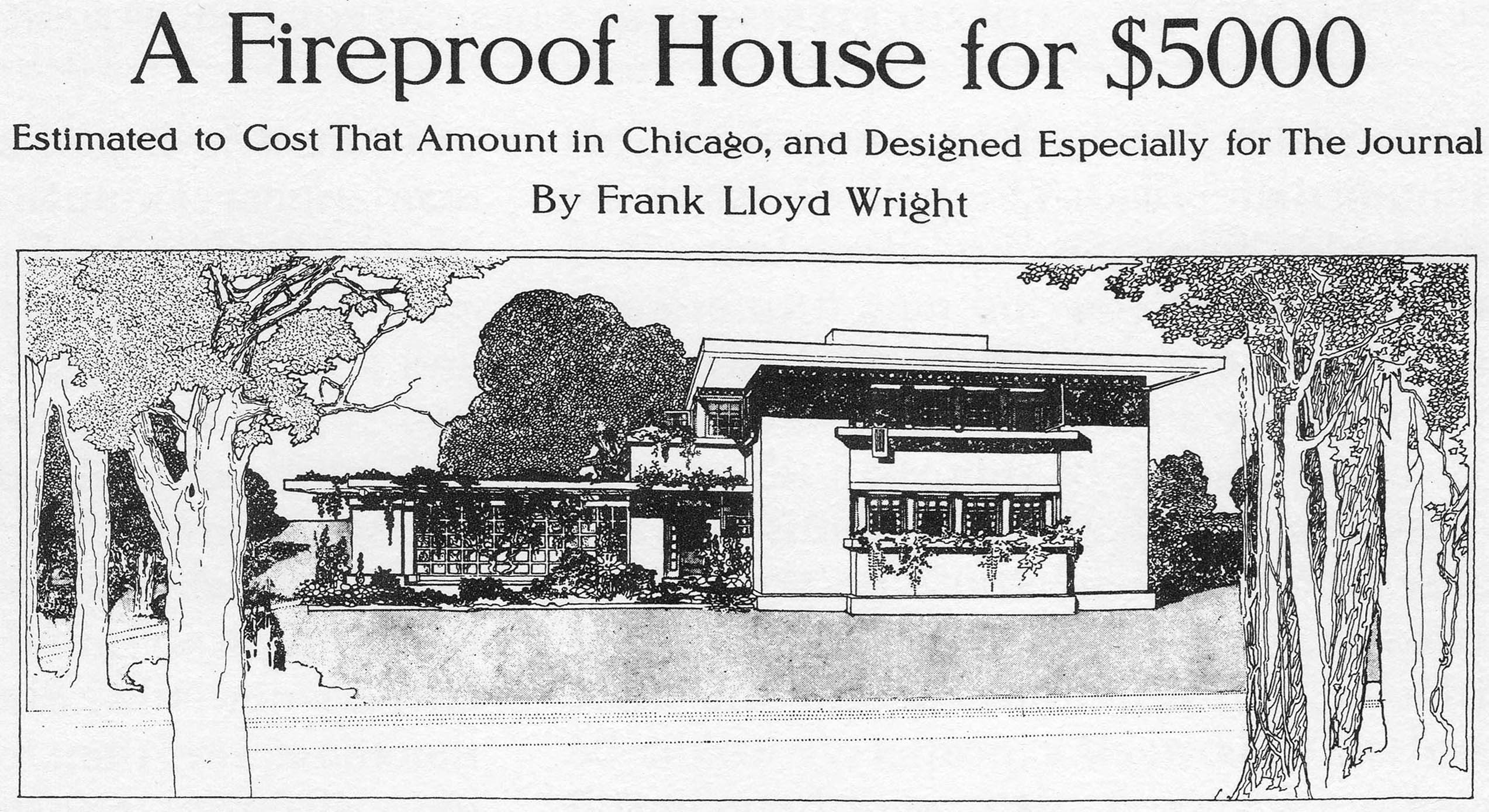
Wright's proposed Concrete House with a trellised side pergola, published in Ladies' Home Journal in 1907, was clearly derived from the Lamp House.

The Concrete House was also depicted in the Wasmuth Portfolio published in 1910. Plate XIVa shows an open floor plan: no wall separates the living and dining rooms.

== Potential development ==
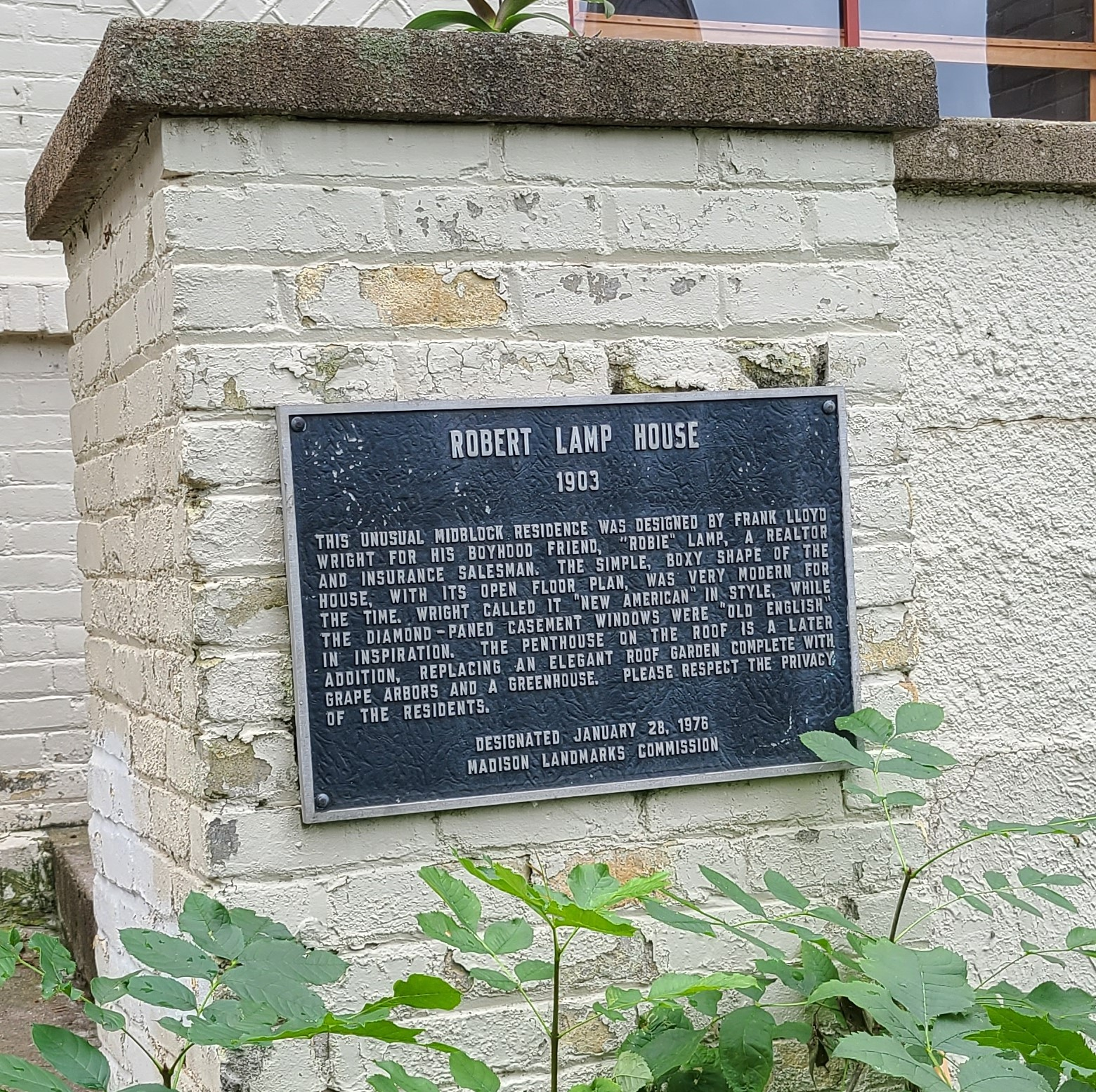
Robert Lamp House plaque

Madison's current zoning calls for the demolition of numerous smaller buildings in the area near the Capitol Square and along East Washington Avenue. Two nearby houses, at 506 East Washington Avenue and 7 North Franklin Street, were both built circa 1853 by Wisconsin's second governor, Leonard J. Farwell. In May 2013, the Fred Rouse Company, a local developer, proposed building a six-story apartment building to the north of the Lamp House that would have led to the demolition of three adjacent houses constructed between 1872 and 1904. Opposition to the plan prompted district alderperson Ledell Zellers in September 2013 to form an ad hoc committee to advise on plans for the block. The committee recommended that the northern viewscape toward Lake Mendota be preserved. In 2014, four houses south of the Lamp House were demolished to make room for a six-story apartment building.

== See also ==
- List of Frank Lloyd Wright works
- National Register of Historic Places in Madison, Wisconsin
