= Edmund D. Brigham House =

Historic house in Illinois, United States

- U.S. National Register of Historic Places
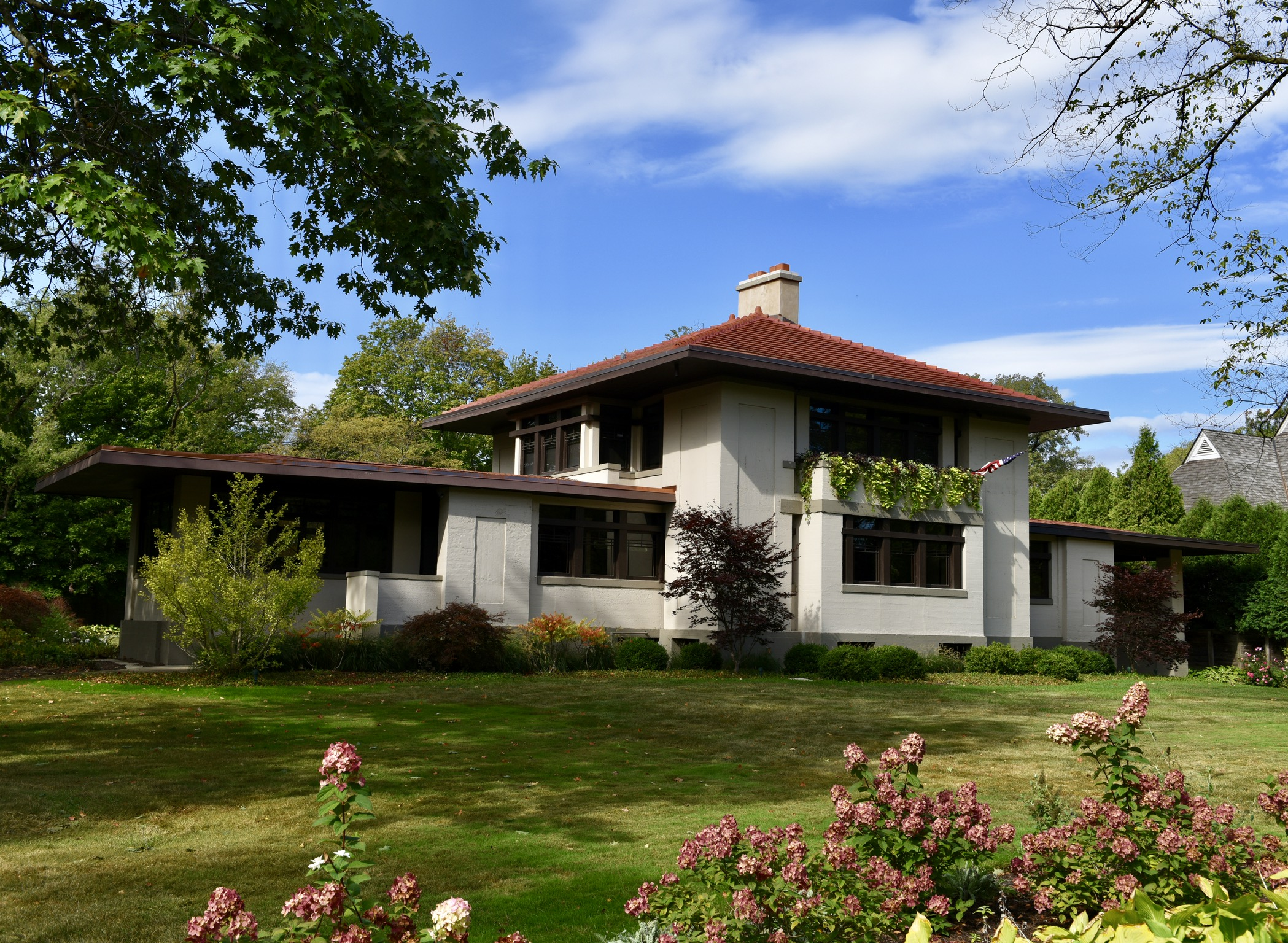

- Location within Chicago metropolitan area Location within Illinois Location within the United States
- Location: 790 Sheridan Rd., Glencoe, Illinois
- Coordinates: 42°08′22″N 87°45′18″W
- Built: 1909
- Architect: Frank Lloyd Wright
- Architectural style: Prairie School
- NRHP reference No.: 16000900
- Added to NRHP: December 27, 2016

The Edmund D. Brigham House is a house designed by Frank Lloyd Wright at 790 Sheridan Road in Glencoe, Illinois. Wright designed the house circa 1908 for Edmund D. Brigham, a freight agent for the Chicago & North Western Railway, and it was completed the following year. Wright's design is a variation of the one in his article "A Fireproof House for $5000", a concrete home design which he published in the Ladies' Home Journal in 1907. While the Brigham House was the only one of Wright's Fireproof House for $5000 designs actually built with concrete, he would continue to work and experiment with the material throughout his career. The house's Prairie School plan has a central two-story section with one-story wings on either side, several rows of casement windows, and large piers at the corners of the central section and the middle of each wing.

The house was added to the National Register of Historic Places on December 27, 2016.
