= David C. Dart =

American architect

David C. Dart was an architect in Salt Lake City, Utah. At least four of his works are listed on the National Register of Historic Places.

Works include:

- Greenwald Furniture Company Building (1903), 35 W. 300 South Salt Lake City, UT Dart, David C., et al., NRHP-listed
- Hotel Victor, 155 W. 200 South Salt Lake City, UT Dart, David C., NRHP-listed
- Judge Building, 8 E. 300 South Salt Lake City, UT Dart, David C., NRHP-listed
- House at 206 Douglas, designed by Dart for himself and his family, included as a contributing building in the NRHP-listed University Neighborhood Historic District (Salt Lake City, Utah), NRHP-listed
