= Smith Apartments =

Historic building in Salt Lake City, Utah, U.S.

- U.S. National Register of Historic Places
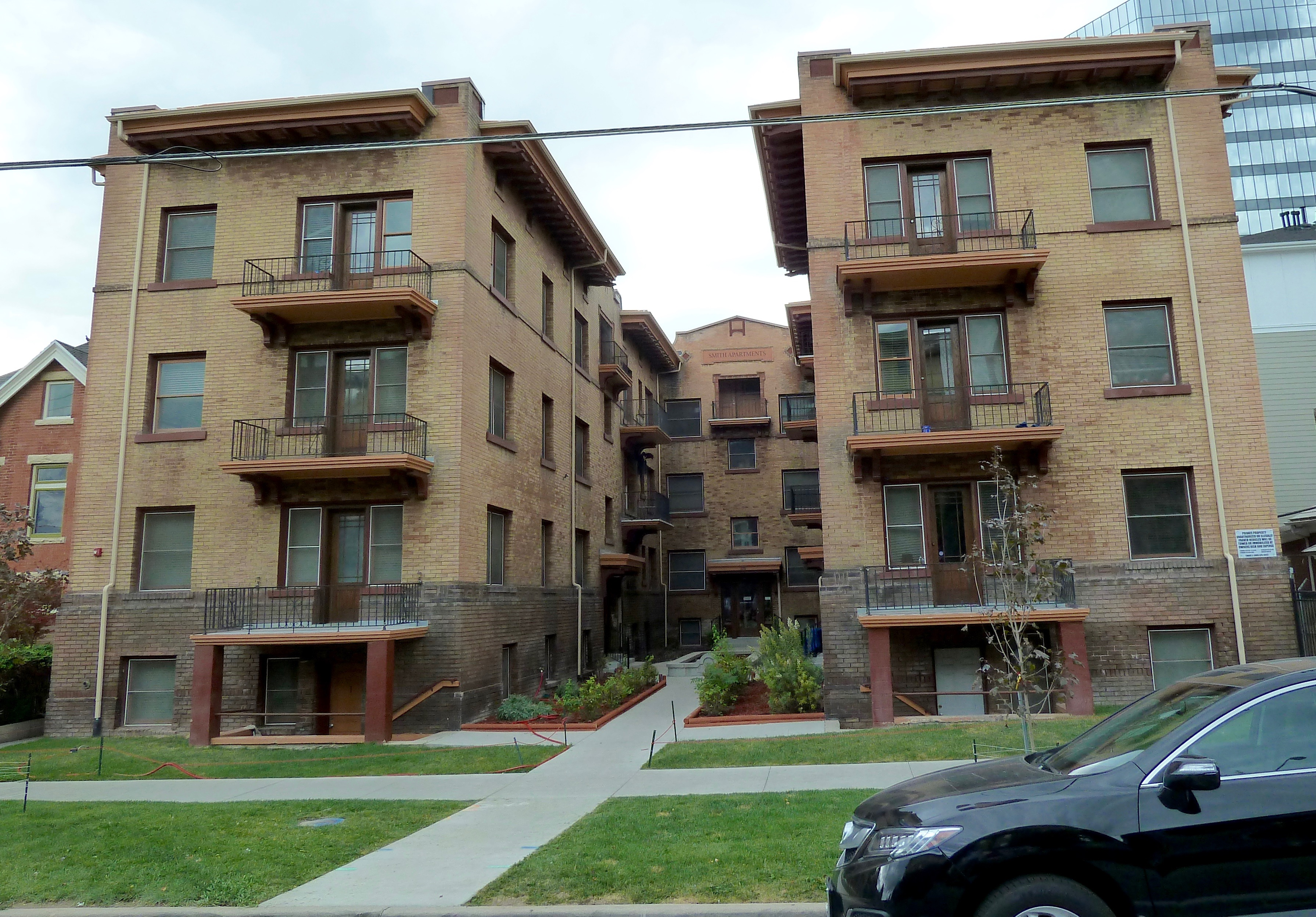
- The building in 2016

- Location within Utah Location within the United States
- Location: 228 South 300 East, Salt Lake City, Utah
- Coordinates: 40°45′51″N 111°52′45″W
- Area: less than one acre
- Built: 1908
- Built by: Andrew and James E. McDonald
- Architect: Walter E. Ware, Alberto O. Treganza
- Architectural style: Prairie School, Walk-up
- MPS: Salt Lake City MPS
- NRHP reference No.: 89001740
- Added to NRHP: October 20, 1989

Smith Apartments is a historic three-story building in Salt Lake City, Utah. It was built as a U-shaped residential building by Andrew and James E. McDonald in 1908, and designed in the Prairie School style by architects Walter E. Ware and Alberto O. Treganza. It belonged to David Smith, a rancher from Idaho, until 1944, when it was acquired by the Riverton Motor Company. It has been listed on the National Register of Historic Places since October 20, 1989.
