= Ridge vent =

Vent installed at the peak of a sloped roof

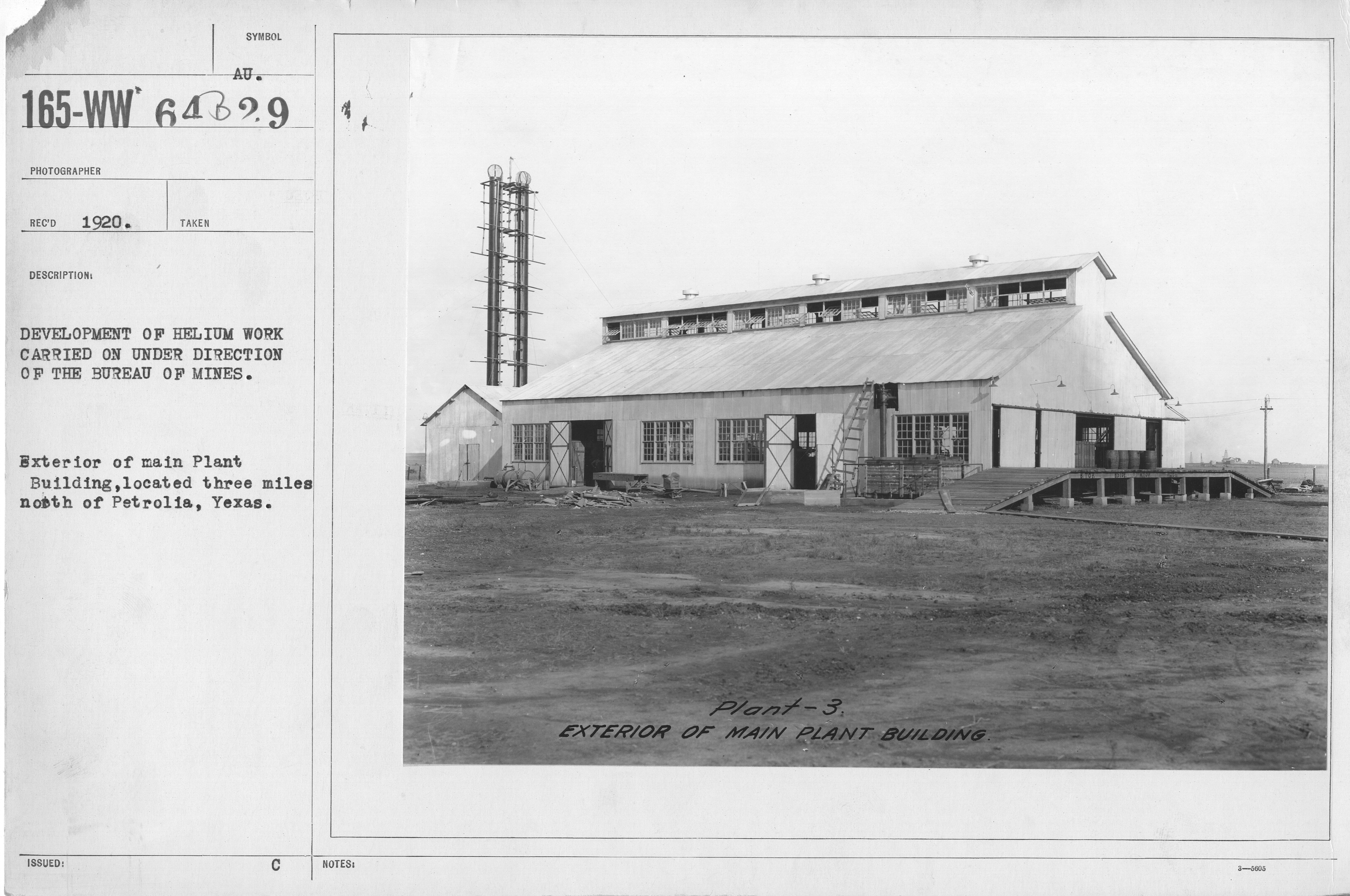
Early 20th century industrial gas processing plant near Petrolia, Texas. Structure is illustration of natural ventilation with a ridge vent.

A ridge vent is a type of vent installed at the peak of a sloped roof which allows warm, humid air to escape a building's attic. Ridge vents are most common on shingled residential buildings.

Ridge vents are also used in industrial warehouses to help release the hot air and help circulate comfortable air inside the building.

For ridge venting to be effective, soffit vents must be present, especially on residential applications. Most shingle manufacturers have ventilation calculators to help you calculate the right amount of ventilation to add to a home.
