= Jesse R. Zeigler House =

Historic house in Kentucky, United States

- Rev. Jesse R. Zeigler House
- U.S. National Register of Historic Places
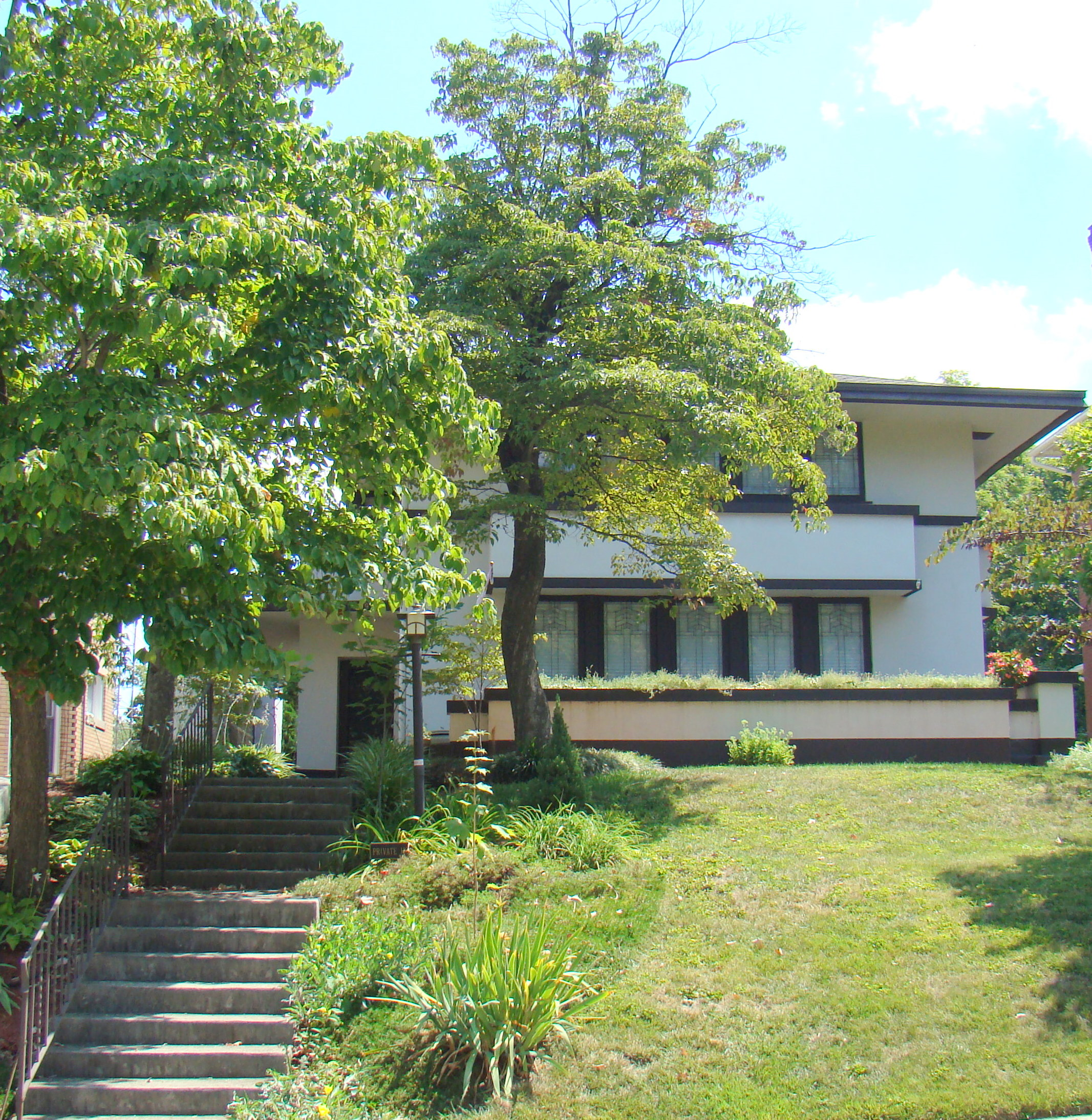
- Front of the house

- Location within Kentucky Location within the United States
- Location: 509 Shelby St., Frankfort, Kentucky
- Coordinates: 38°11′26″N 84°52′35″W
- Area: Less than 1 acre (0.40 ha)
- Built: 1909
- Architect: Frank Lloyd Wright
- Architectural style: Prairie School
- NRHP reference No.: 76000885
- Added to NRHP: May 3, 1976

The Reverend Jesse R. Zeigler Residence is a house in Frankfort, Kentucky, United States. It was the only house designed by Frank Lloyd Wright to be built in Kentucky during his lifetime. The design came from a chance meeting between Zeigler and Wright while both were traveling to Europe in late October 1909. They struck up a conversation and the commission of this structure, completed the following year, was the result. The structure is a typical example of Wright's "A Fireproof House for $5000".

The structure was placed on the National Register of Historic Places in 1976. The house is privately owned and is not available for tours. In 2025, the Zeigler House was placed for sale.

== Gallery ==
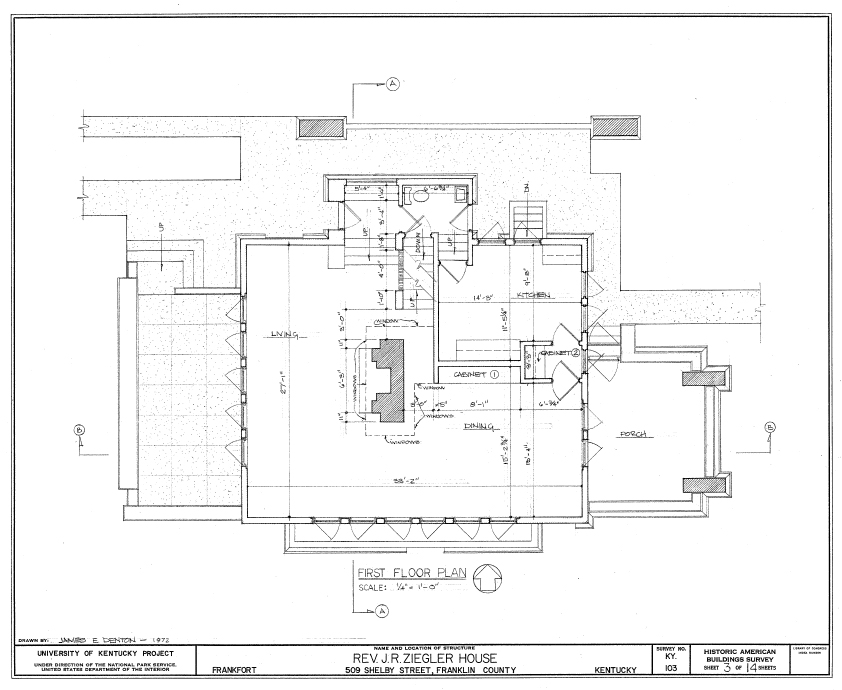
First floor plan

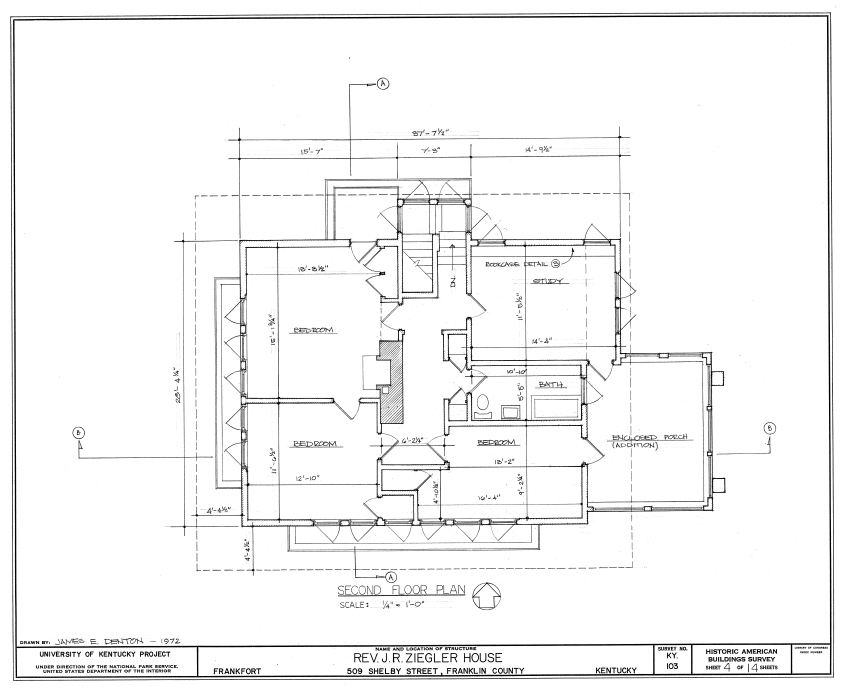
Second floor plan (non-original, enclosed rear porch has been removed since 1972

== See also ==
- List of Frank Lloyd Wright works
- National Register of Historic Places listings in Franklin County, Kentucky
