= University Neighborhood Historic District (Salt Lake City) =

Historic district in Utah, United States

- U.S. National Register of Historic Places
- U.S. Historic district
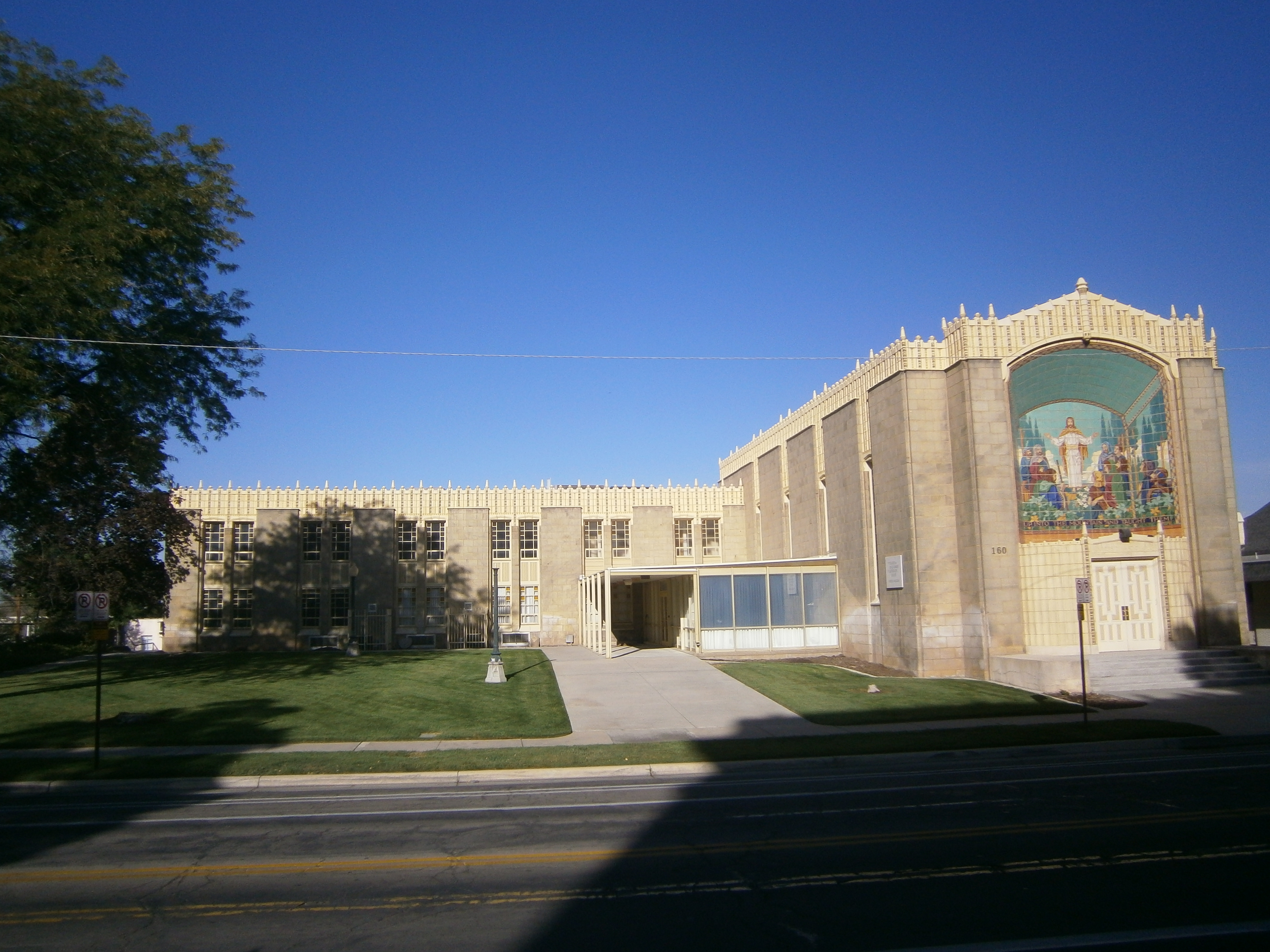
- The University Ward Chapel in the historic district

- Location within Utah Location within the United States
- Location: Roughly bounded by 500 South, South Temple, 1100 East and University Street in Salt Lake City, Utah; United States
- Coordinates: 40.764°N 111.856°W
- Area: 180 acres (73 ha)
- Architect: Ware & Treganza, Carl Neuhausen, Hyrum Pope, Harold W. Burton, Nancy A. Leatherwood, others
- Architectural style: Bungalow/American Craftsman, Tudor Revival, Late Victorian
- NRHP reference No.: 95001430
- Added to NRHP: December 13, 1995

The University Neighborhood Historic District is a 180 acres (73 ha) historic district near the University of Utah campus in northeastern Salt Lake City, Utah, United States, that was listed on the National Register of Historic Places in 1995.

== Description ==
The district's listing included 451 contributing buildings, a contributing structure, and two contributing sites, as well as 134 non-contributing buildings and 9 properties already NRHP-listed.

The district is roughly bounded by 500 South, South Temple, 1100 East, and University Street in Salt Lake City. It includes works by architects Ware & Treganza, Carl Neuhausen and others. Also included is the home of architect David C. Dart. Dart "built the house at 206 Douglas for his family in 1907. He was a well-known local architect who designed buildings around Salt Lake City, including the Judge Building (National Register 1979), Patrick Dry Goods Building, and Our Lady of Lourdes Chapel (all still in existence)."

Another residence in the district is at 1133 East 300 South and the principal residence of educator William M. Stewart, who served 25 years at the University of Utah, including assisting the rise of the Stewart School there, which trained teachers. William M. Stewart also had a summer residence, a log cabin in Wasatch County, Utah, the Ethelbert White and William M. Stewart Ranch House, which is separately listed on the NRHP.

== See also ==
- National Register of Historic Places listings in Salt Lake City
