= Lollin Block =

Historic building in Salt Lake City, Utah, U.S.

- U.S. National Register of Historic Places
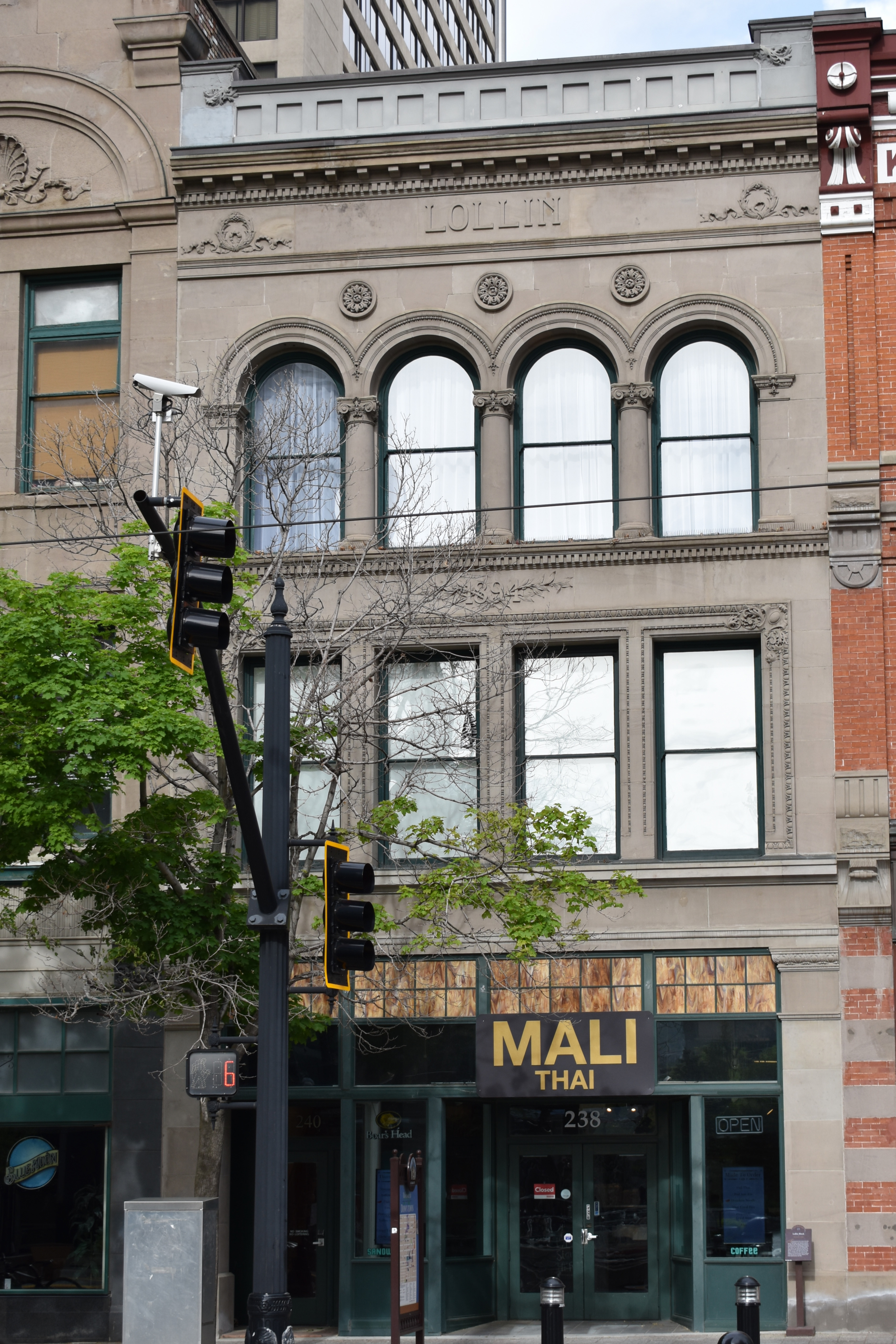
- The Lollin Block in 2019

- Location within Utah Location within the United States
- Location: 238 S. Main St., Salt Lake City, Utah, US
- Coordinates: 40°45′51″N 111°53′27″W
- Area: less than one acre
- Built: 1894
- Architect: Richard K.A. Kletting
- Architectural style: Classical Revival, Neo-Classical Revival
- NRHP reference No.: 77001311
- Added to NRHP: August 18, 1977

The Lollin Block, at 238 S. Main St. in Salt Lake City, Utah, is a three-story brick and stone commercial building designed by Richard K.A. Kletting and constructed in 1894. The building includes a plaster facade "scored to give the appearance of smooth, cut stone," with a denticulated cornice and Classical Revival features. It was added to the National Register of Historic Places in 1977.

Well known as a saloon keeper, John Lollin (January 3, 1840 – April 7, 1915) was a Danish immigrant and 1857 pioneer who engaged in several business ventures prior to constructing the Lollin Block. He and Diantha (Mayer) Lollin lived on the third floor of the building from 1894 until Lollin's death in 1915. Diantha Lollin continued to reside in the building until 1934. Their son Carl lived in the building until 1960.

The building cost $13,000. The first floor was leased by the Davis Shoe Company during 1901 to 1913, by a Hudson Bay Fur Company store during 1915 to 1965, and by Music City and the G.E.M. Music Store during 1965 to 1979 or later.

Mr. Lollin was apparently "adequately impressed" with Kletting's work in the adjoining Karrick Block (1887) at 236 South Main Street to commission this.
