= Dooly Building =

Coordinates: 40.77319°N 111.89434°W

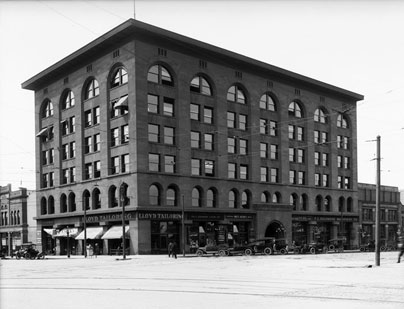
Dooly Block, Salt Lake City, Utah

The Dooly Building was an office building designed by architect Louis Sullivan in Salt Lake City, Utah, at 109 West Second South Street. It was one of four buildings Sullivan designed in the western United States. Built in 1892, it was demolished in 1964. It was described by the Historic American Buildings Survey as the best work by Sullivan in the west. The building's contractor was Bernard Henry Lichter. Tenants included a post office, the Alta Club, and offices of architects and engineers. The Dooly Building was named for John E. Dooly, a member of the building's investment syndicate and a prominent civic leader.

The six-story building used a structural steel frame, with a masonry facade and wood floor joists, fireproofed by cinder aggregate in the joist spaces. The exterior featured a sandstone storefront at street level, with a row of paired arched windows above. The top four floors were brick with paired sashes, the topmost pairs arched at the top. A plain, deeply overhanging cornice crowned the building. The main entrance was a deep arch at the center of the long elevation. The rear walls were common brick, plainly detailed. Heating was originally provided by potbelly stoves in each suite with flues in the building's columns.

The McIntyre Building (1908-09), also in Salt Lake City, designed by architect Richard K. A. Kletting, has been asserted to be "the earliest and best example of Sullivanesque architecture in the state" besides the Dooly Building.
