= Kletting Peak =

Mountain in Summit County, Utah, United States

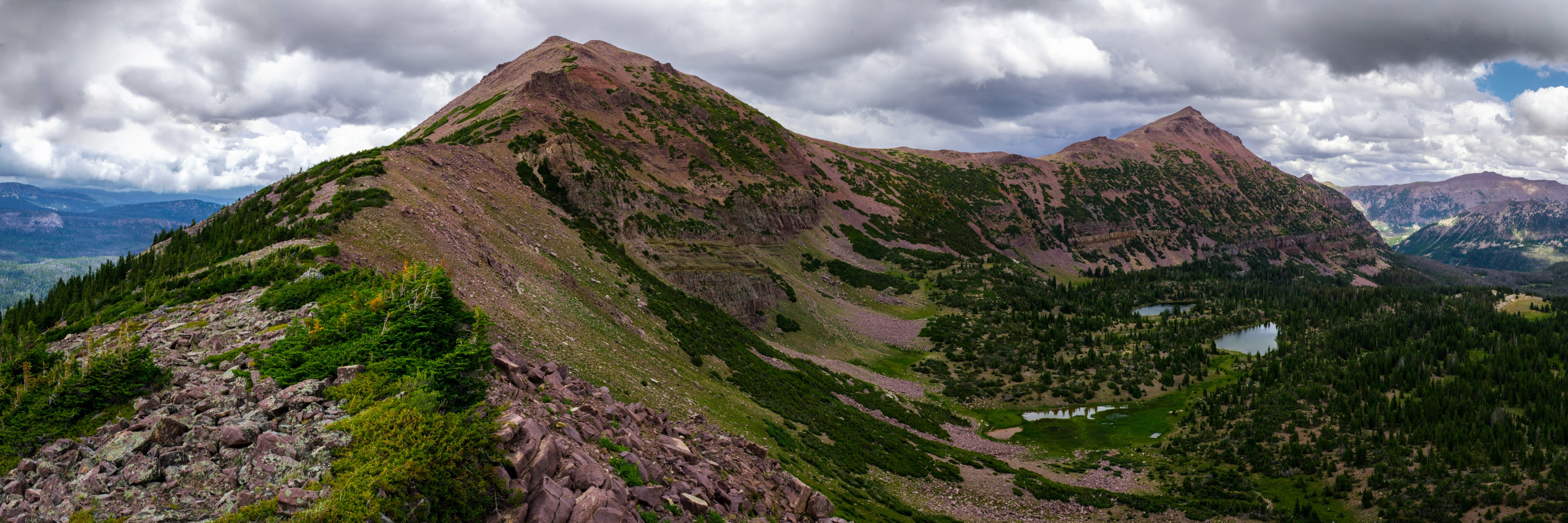
- South aspect of Kletting Peak (A-1 Peak to the right)

Highest point
- Elevation: 12,060 feet (3,676 m) NAVD 88
- Prominence: 495 ft (151 m)
- Listing: Utah 12,000-foot Peaks
- Coordinates: 40°45′47″N 110°51′23″W

Geography
- Location within Utah
- Location: Summit County, Utah, U.S.
- Parent range: Uinta Range
- Topo map: USGS Christmas Meadows

Climbing
- Easiest route: Scramble (class 2 or better)

Kletting Peak is a mountain in Summit County, Utah, named in 1964 for Utah architect Richard K.A. Kletting (1858-1943). It is in the High Uintas Wilderness and the Uinta-Wasatch-Cache National Forest.

The summit is at 12,060 feet (3,676 m), has 495 feet (151 m) of clean prominence, and is relatively easy overland scramble (class 2 or better). It ranks 101st on a list of Utah mountains having more than 200 feet of prominence.

== See also ==
- List of mountains in Utah
