= Henry Dinwoodey House =

Historic house in Salt Lake City, Utah, United States

- U.S. National Register of Historic Places
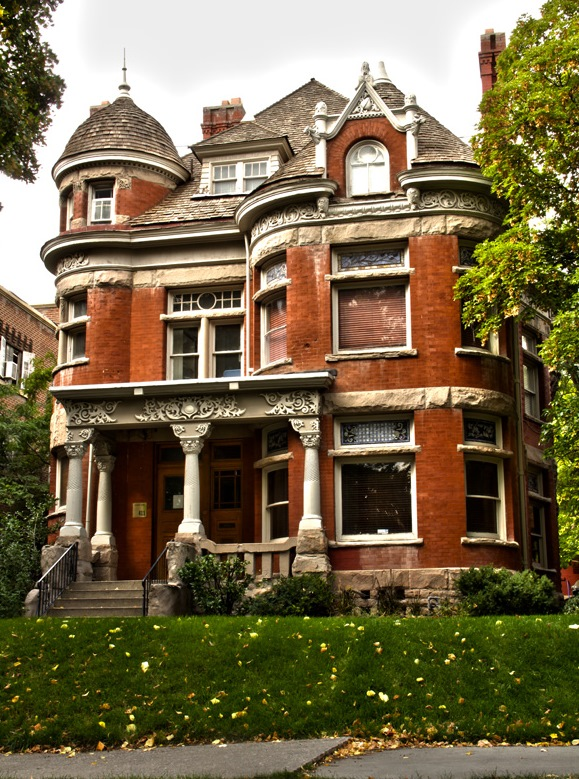
- House in 2012

- Location within Utah Location within the United States
- Location: 411 E. 100 South, Salt Lake City, Utah
- Coordinates: 40°46′4″N 111°52′42″W
- Area: less than one acre
- Built: 1890
- Architect: Kletting, Richard
- Architectural style: Late Victorian
- NRHP reference No.: 74001936
- Added to NRHP: July 24, 1974

The Henry Dinwoodey House, at 411 East 100 South, Salt Lake City, Utah, is a Late Victorian house that was designed by Richard Kletting, architect of the Utah State Capitol. It was built in 1890 and was listed on the National Register of Historic Places in 1974. The house exhibits characteristics of both Queen Anne Style architecture, with its asymmetrical facade and corner turret, and Romanesque Revival style, including rough-hewn stone, squat columns, and foliated carvings.

== History ==
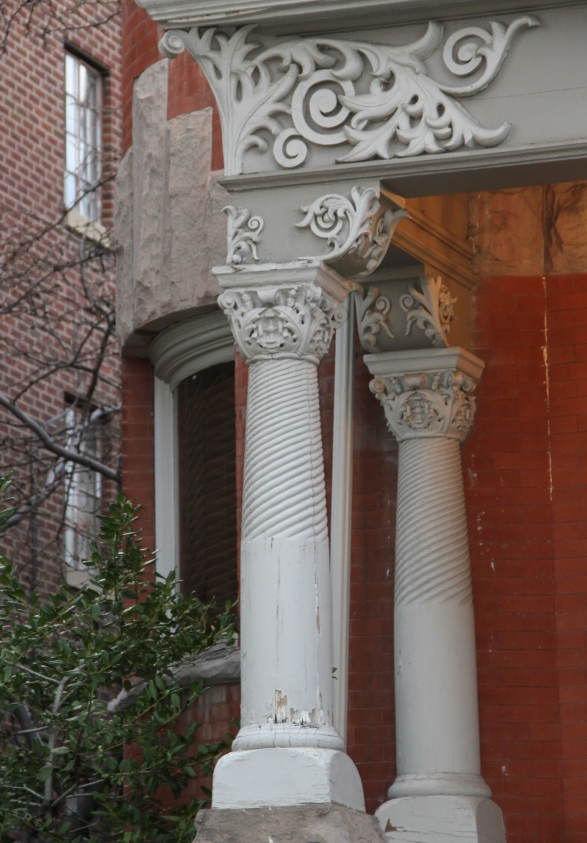
Squat Romanesque columns with foliated capitals are seen on the porch of the house.

The house was built as a home for Sara Kinersley, the third polygamous wife of Henry Dinwoodey, a Mormon. It is historically significant mostly for its connection to Henry Dinwoodey, owner of a very successful furniture business in Utah and the broader Intermountain region. Dinwoodey was jailed as a polygamist in the 1880s.

== See also ==
- National Register of Historic Places listings in Salt Lake City
