= Albert Fisher Mansion and Carriage House =

Historic house in Salt Lake City, Utah, U.S.

- U.S. National Register of Historic Places
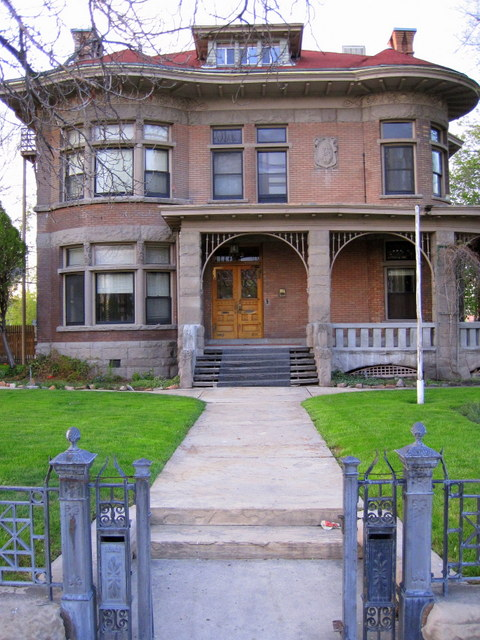

- Location within Utah Location within the United States
- Location: 1206 West 200 South, Salt Lake City, Utah
- Coordinates: 40°45′55″N 111°55′30″W
- Area: 1 acre (0.40 ha)
- Built: 1893
- Architect: Kletting, Richard K.A.
- Architectural style: Late Victorian, Eclectic
- NRHP reference No.: 83004675
- Added to NRHP: October 8, 2008

The Albert Fisher Mansion and Carriage House, at 1206 West 200 South in Salt Lake City, Utah, United States, was designed by architect Richard K.A. Kletting and was built in 1893. It was listed on the National Register of Historic Places in 2008. Kletting was the architect behind many distinguished Utah buildings of the period, including the Utah State Capitol.

In 2006, the Salt Lake City government purchased the house, which was originally the home of a prominent German brewer. Restoration costs were estimated at over $1.7 million, so the city began raising money by arranging tours of the property, and $150,000 was obtained through a federal grant.

As a consequence of the Salt Lake City 5.7 magnitude earthquake on March 18, 2020, the mansion was damaged, leading to a closure of the building to the public, boarding up of all the windows and the removal all three damaged chimneys down to the roofline.

In September 2020, a plan was approved to renovate the Fisher Carriage House by local preservation firm CRSA, which included fixing damage it sustained in the earthquake and adapting the carriage house into a river engagement center for the Jordan River.

In March 2022, someone stole the fence which surrounded the mansion. The fence may have been a custom design by the architect of the mansion, Kletting, although it is also possible that it was ordered from an out-of-state supplier and added at a later date.
