= New York Hotel (Salt Lake City) =

Historic building in Salt Lake City, Utah, U.S.

- U.S. National Register of Historic Places
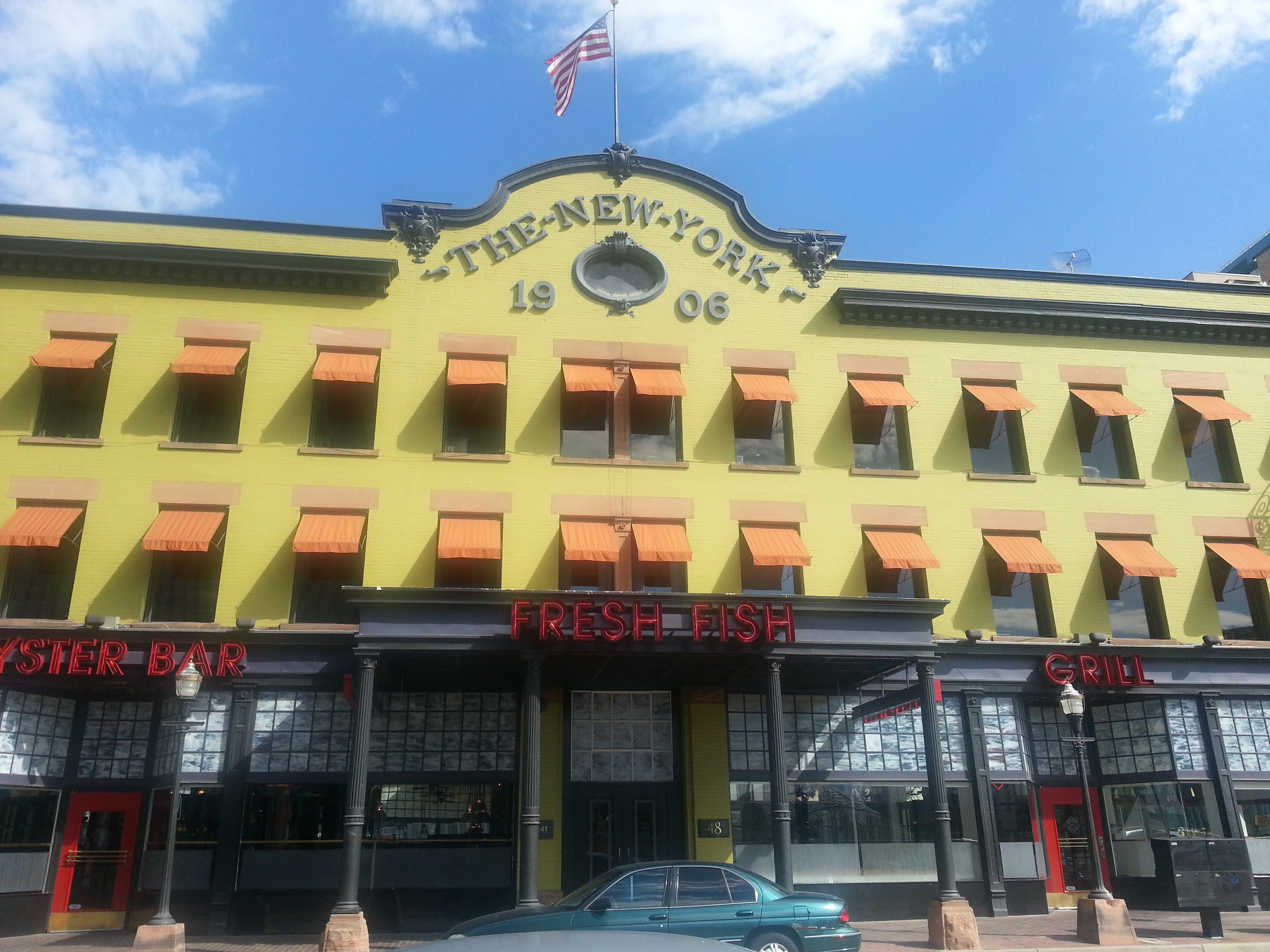

- Location within Utah
- Location: 42 Post Office Pl., Salt Lake City, Utah
- Coordinates: 40°45′42″N 111°53′31″W
- Area: less than one acre
- Built: 1906
- Architect: Kletting, Richard K.A.
- NRHP reference No.: 80003933
- Added to NRHP: March 10, 1980

The New York Hotel in Salt Lake City, Utah, at 42 Post Office Pl., was built in 1906. It was listed on the National Register of Historic Places in 1980.

== History ==
It was a work of leading Salt Lake City architect Richard K.A. Kletting.

It is a three-story brick building designed to have shops on the ground floor and 62 hotel rooms above. Some hotel room suites had bathrooms; there were also single rooms served by a bathroom on each floor. It was "completely modern" in 1906, having both steam heat and electric lights.

The building is 49 feet (15 m) tall; the first/second/third floors are 14 feet (4.3 m), 10 feet (3.0 m), and 10.5 feet (3.2 m) tall, respectively.

It was built as a luxury hotel for Orange J. Salisbury, a mining engineer and businessman who obtained patents and started the United Filter Corporation.
