= Riverton Ward Meetinghouse =

Historic building in Riverton, Utah, US

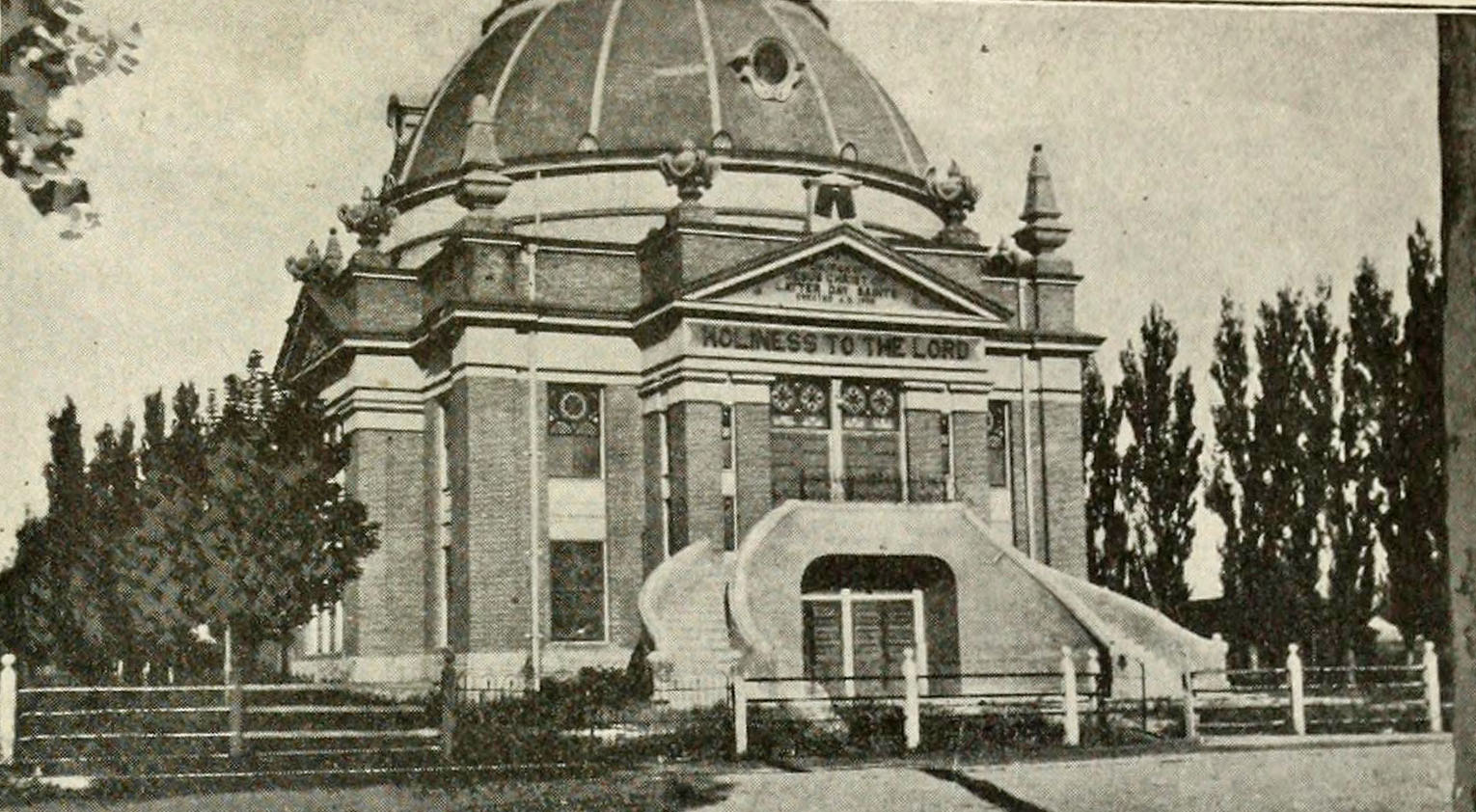
Riverton Ward Meeting House

The Riverton Ward Meetinghouse, in Riverton, Utah, was designed by renowned Utah architect, Richard K.A. Kletting. Construction began in 1899 and wasn't complete until its dedication over ten years later in 1920. It stood on the northwest corner of Redwood Road and 12800 South and was demolished in 1940.

It was known colloquially as the Old Dome Church, and served as the primary inspiration for the Old Dome Meeting Hall, which opened at the north entrance of Riverton City Park in 2015.
