= J. R. Allen House =

Historic house in Utah, United States

- U.S. National Register of Historic Places
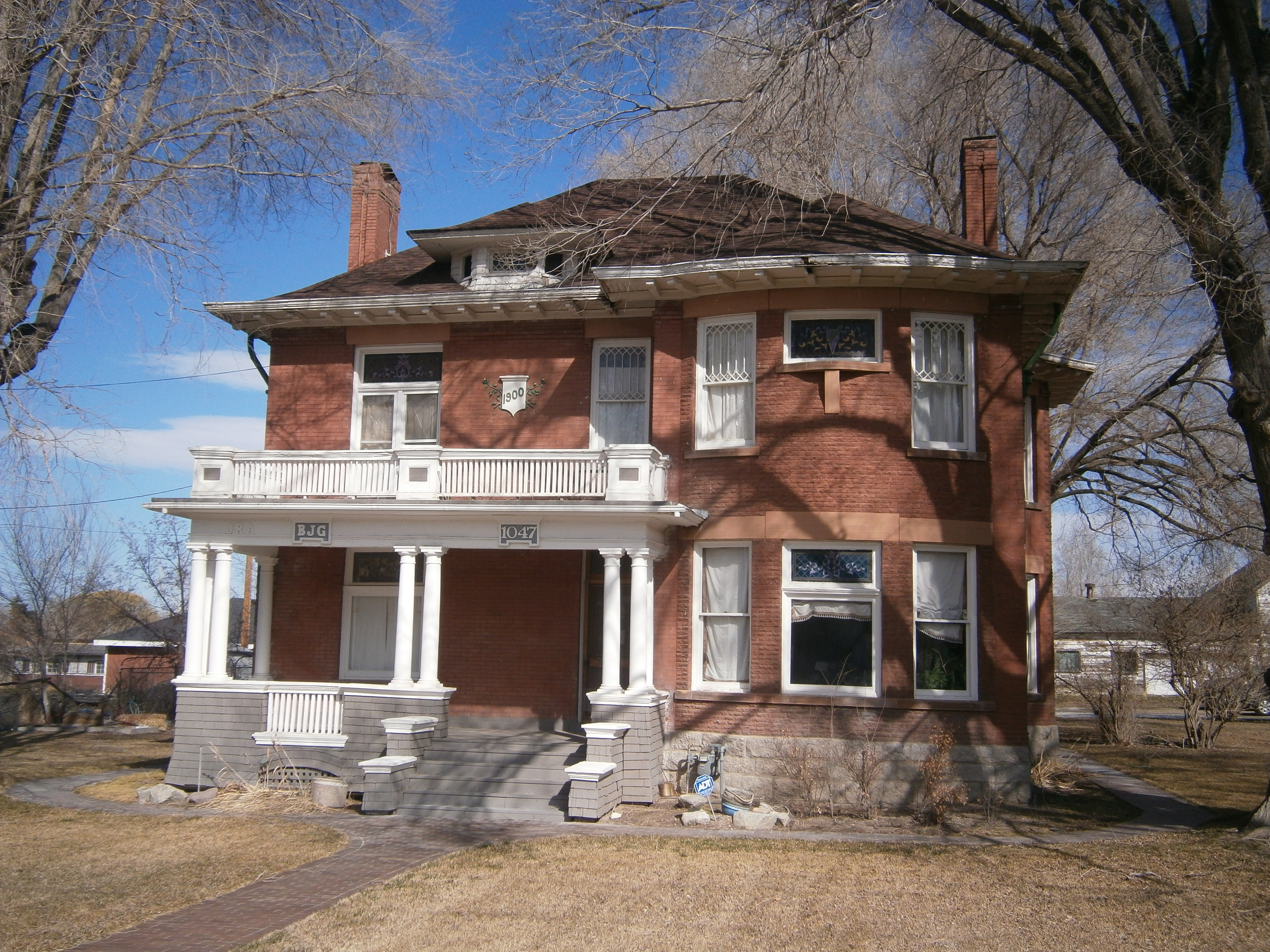

- Location within Utah Location within the United States
- Location: 1047 E. 13200 South, Draper, Utah
- Coordinates: 40°30′44″N 111°51′41″W
- Area: 4 acres (1.6 ha)
- Built: 1899-1900
- Architect: Kletting, Richard Karl August
- Architectural style: Box Style Scheme
- NRHP reference No.: 80003912
- Added to NRHP: August 28, 1980

The J. R. Allen House, is a historic house located at 1047 East 13200 South in Draper, Utah. It is significant as one of relatively few surviving residences designed by Richard K.A. Kletting.

== Description and history ==
It was built in 1899–1900, and was designed by American architect Richard K.A. Kletting, designer of the Utah State Capitol building. Its importance in that way is magnified by documentation in photographs and in original plans that remain available. It is also important as an artifact of Jackson R. Allen, born 1869 in Draper, who was "a prominent and innovative stockman".

It was listed on the National Register of Historic Places on August 28, 1980.
