= Reed O. Smoot House =

Historic house in Utah, United States

- Reed Smoot House
- U.S. National Register of Historic Places
- U.S. National Historic Landmark
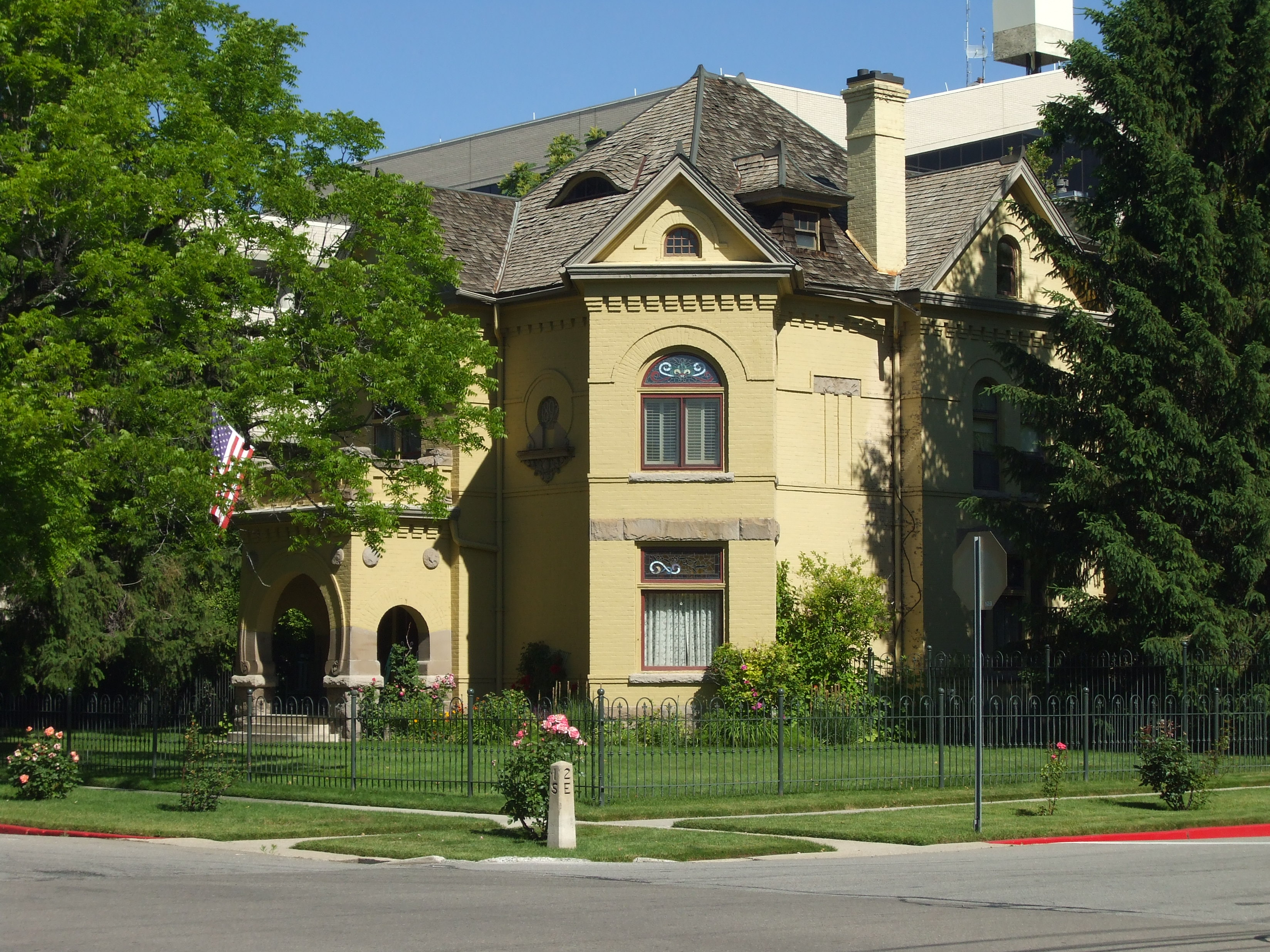
- View from the southeast

- Location within Utah Location within the United States
- Interactive map showing the location of Reed Smoot House
- Location: 183 East 100 South; Provo, Utah; United States
- Coordinates: 40°13′58″N 111°39′16″W
- Built: 1892
- Architect: Kletting, Richard K.A.; Smoot, Reed
- Architectural style: Late Victorian
- NRHP reference No.: 75001831

Significant dates
- Added to NRHP: October 14, 1975
- Designated NHL: December 8, 1976

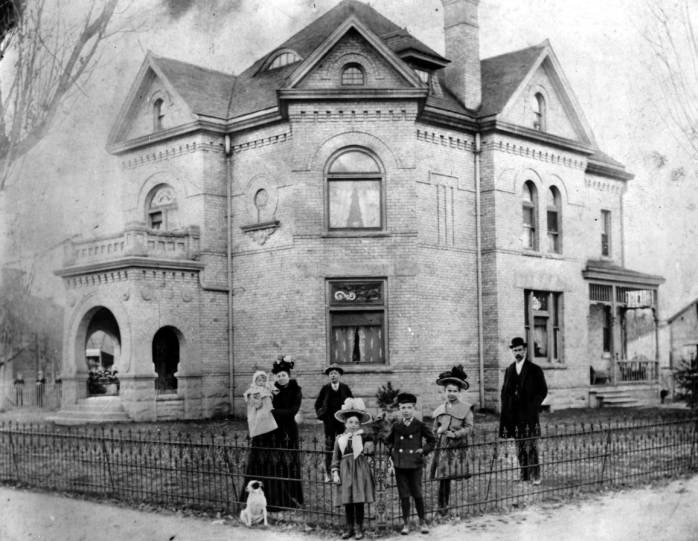
Smoot family in front of their house (circa 1900)

The Reed Smoot House, also known as Mrs. Harlow E. Smoot House, was the home of Reed Smoot from 1892 to his death in 1941, and is located at 183 E. 100 South, Provo, Utah, United States. Smoot was a prominent US Senator best known for advocacy of protectionism and the Smoot–Hawley Tariff Act.

It was declared a National Historic Landmark in 1976.

Smoot himself drew the first designs for the house, and Richard K.A. Kletting completed the design. The house cost over four thousand dollars to complete. "Victorian Eclectic in design, it is a Stately, solid, early Mormon square block home with some Victorian exuberance displayed in the detailing. The home is linked with Utah's early political and religious history, and is the site of several visits from U.S. presidents in the early twentieth century (Historic Provo p. 20)."

== See also ==
- List of National Historic Landmarks in Utah
- National Register of Historic Places listings in Utah County, Utah
