= Oquirrh School =

Historic building in Salt Lake City, Utah, U.S.

- U.S. National Register of Historic Places
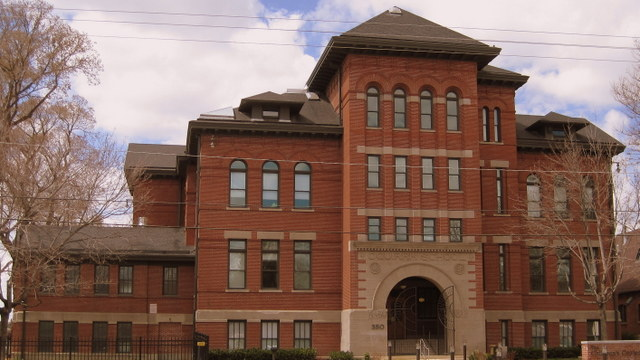

- Location within Utah Location within the United States
- Location: 350 S. 400 E., Salt Lake City, Utah
- Coordinates: 40°45′41″N 111°52′49″W
- Area: 1.6 acres (0.65 ha)
- Built: 1894
- Architect: Kletting, Richard K.A.
- Architectural style: Romanesque, Renaissance
- NRHP reference No.: 08001156
- Added to NRHP: December 4, 2008

The Oquirrh School, at 350 South 400 East in Salt Lake City, Utah, was built in 1894. It is in Romanesque and/or Renaissance style. It has also been known as Oquirrh Place.

It is the only one out of 10 schools designed by Kletting in Salt Lake City that survives. It was a school into the 1960s, and since has been adaptively reused. Its most recent renovation received a preservation award from the Utah Heritage Foundation.

Big-D Construction notes several awards for the historic renovation.

It was listed on the National Register of Historic Places in 2008.

It may have been designed by architect Richard K.A. Kletting (per NRIS) or it may have been designed by a William Carroll (per article covering Oquirrh School in Salt Lake Herald, 10-28-1892, p. 8).

According to a website about renovation, it was designed by Kletting.
