= Lehi Tabernacle =

Coordinates: 40.39052°N 111.84891°W

The Lehi Tabernacle served as a tabernacle of The Church of Jesus Christ of Latter-day Saints from its 1910 dedication to 1920 when it was sold to the Alpine School District. The building was reestablished as a tabernacle in 1937 until its eventual 1962 demolition in downtown Lehi, Utah, United States.

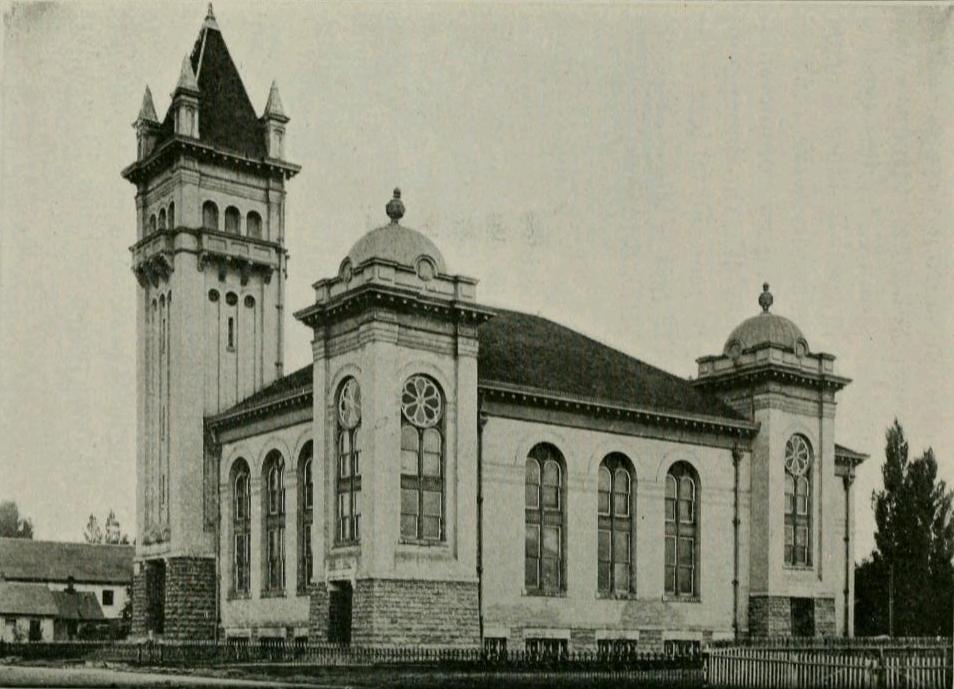
Lehi Tabernacle in 1913

After contributing financially to the construction of the Provo Tabernacle for many years, members of Jesus Christ of Latter-day Saints in Lehi recognized the need to construct a large meetinghouse of their own. A committee was formed who selected and secured the lot and selected the building plans of Salt Lake City architect Richard K.A. Kletting. Excavation began in February 1900. On Sunday, May 15, 1910 the building was dedicated by Joseph F. Smith, then president of the Church of Jesus Christ of Latter-day Saints. The tabernacle was built with white pressed brick and the main tower extended 112 feet. The seating capacity was 1100.

It was determined, by the LDS bishops in Lehi, to be a "financial burden" by 1920, and it was sold for $28,000 to the Alpine School District.

It was deemed unsuitable for the stake, and was demolished in 1962 to make way for a new stake center building.
