= William F. Beer Estate =

Historic buildings in Salt Lake City, Utah, U.S.

- Beer, William F., Estate
- U.S. National Register of Historic Places
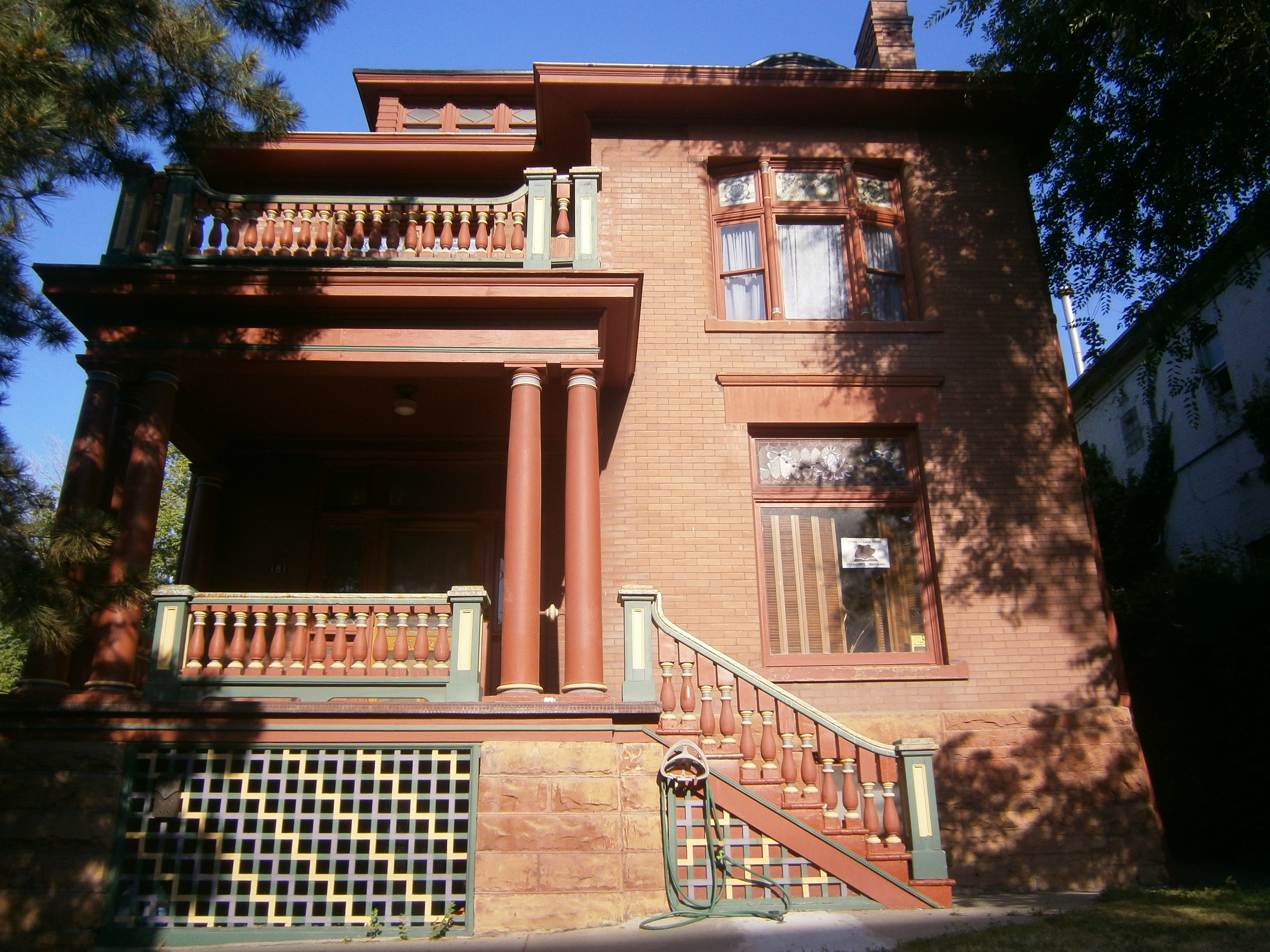

- Location within Utah Location within the United States
- Location: 181 B St. and 222 4th Ave., Salt Lake City, Utah
- Coordinates: 40°46′24″N 111°52′52″W
- Area: less than one acre
- Built: 1880; 1898-99
- Architect: Richard K.A. Kletting
- NRHP reference No.: 77001306
- Added to NRHP: December 6, 1977

The William F. Beer Estate, in Salt Lake City, Utah, was listed on the National Register of Historic Places in 1977. It included four contributing buildings.

The main house, at 181 B Street, is a four-story 26-room, sandstone and brick house built in 1898–99. It is a work of architect Richard K.A. Kletting.

The "Small House", at 222 Fourth Avenue, is a two-story pioneer era structure built with fired brick on a sandstone rubble foundation. It was probably built before 1880 and is one of the oldest buildings in The Avenues neighborhood.

It was home of physician Dr. William Francis Beer (1870-1949), who was a charter member and honorary president of the Utah Medical Society. He also was involved in mining. During World War I he attended German prisoners of war at Fort Douglas, Utah. Due to his effort in bringing the men through the influenza epidemic without any fatalities, he received an Iron Cross from Paul von Hindenburg in the early 1930s.
