= Utah Commercial and Savings Bank Building =

Historic building in Salt Lake City, Utah, U.S.

- U.S. National Register of Historic Places
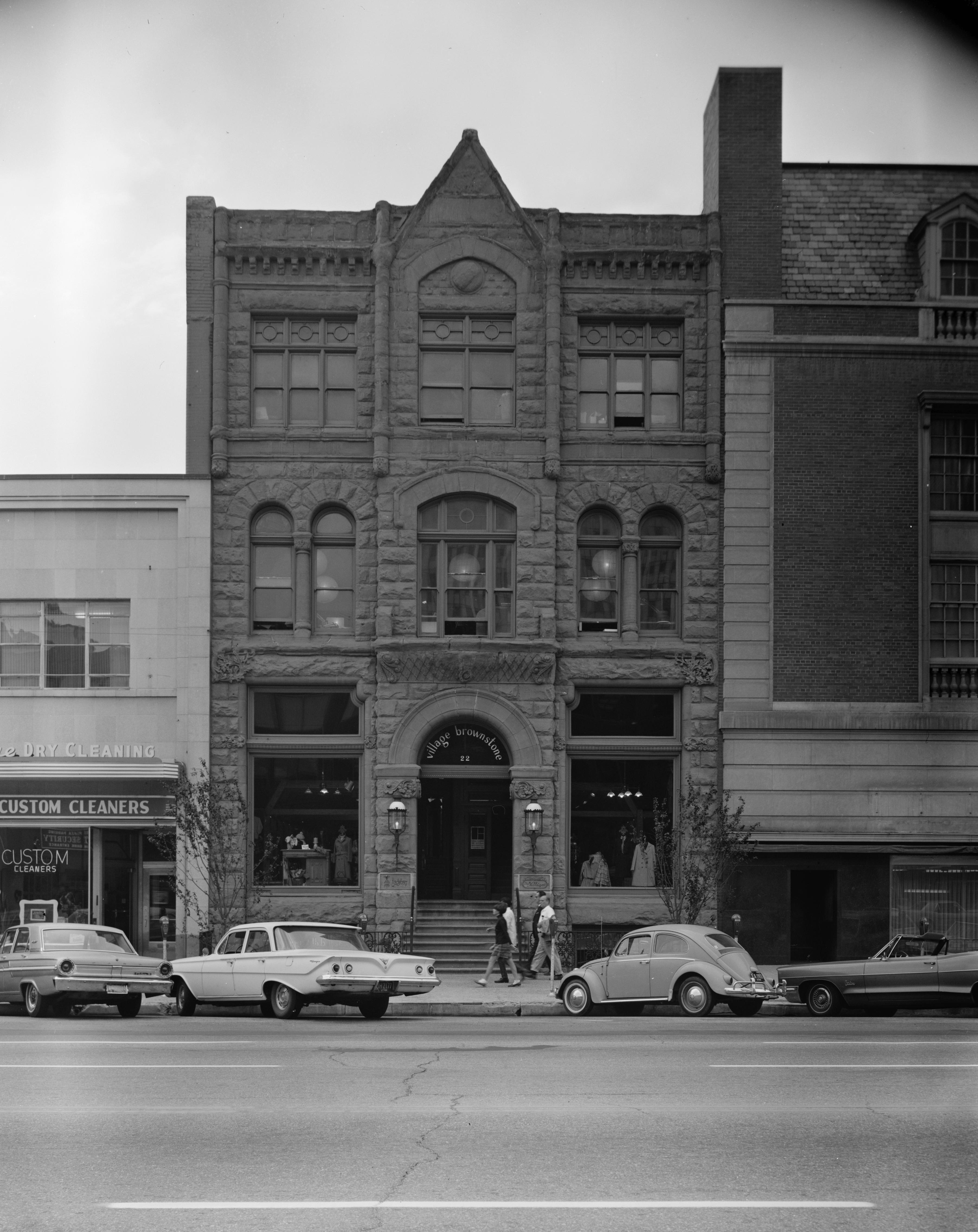
- HABS photo from 1968

- Location within Utah Location within the United States
- Location: 22 East 100 South; Salt Lake City, Utah; United States
- Coordinates: 40°46′1″N 111°53′23″W
- Area: less than one acre
- Built: 1888
- Architect: Kletting, Richard K.A.
- Architectural style: Romanesque, Richardsonian Romanesque
- NRHP reference No.: 75001819
- Added to NRHP: June 18, 1975

The Utah Commercial and Savings Bank Building, at 22 East 100 South in Salt Lake City, Utah, United States, was designed by Richard K.A. Kletting and was built in 1888. Also known as the Village Brownstone Building, it is a Richardsonian Romanesque style building.

== Description ==
The building is important for its architecture and for its association with its architect, Richard K.A. Kletting, and with the founder of the Utah Commercial and Savings Bank, Francis Armstrong.

It was listed on the National Register of Historic Places in 1975.

== See also ==
- National Register of Historic Places listings in Salt Lake City
