= McIntyre Building =

Historic building in Salt Lake City, Utah, U.S.

- U.S. National Register of Historic Places
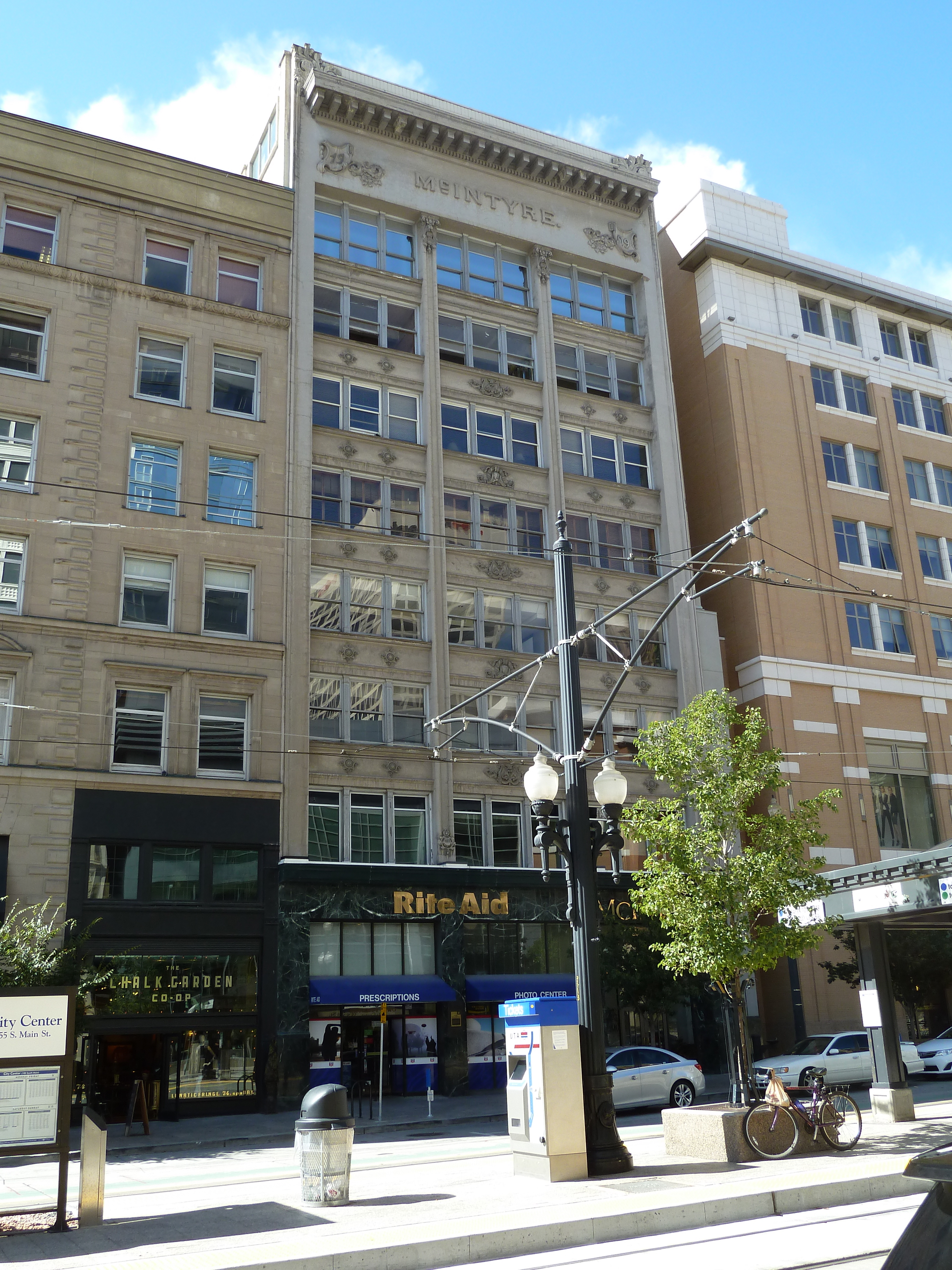
- McIntyre Building, September 2014

- Location within Utah Location within the United States
- Location: 68-72 South Main Street, Salt Lake City, Utah; United States
- Coordinates: 40°46′04″N 111°53′26″W
- Area: less than one acre
- Built: 1908-09
- Built by: Vanderhorst Brothers
- Architect: Richard K.A. Kletting
- Architectural style: Late 19th and Early 20th Century American Movements, Sullivanesque
- NRHP reference No.: 77001313
- Added to NRHP: July 15, 1977

The McIntyre Building is a historic commercial building in downtown Salt Lake City, Utah, United States, that is listed on the National Register of Historic Places (NRHP).

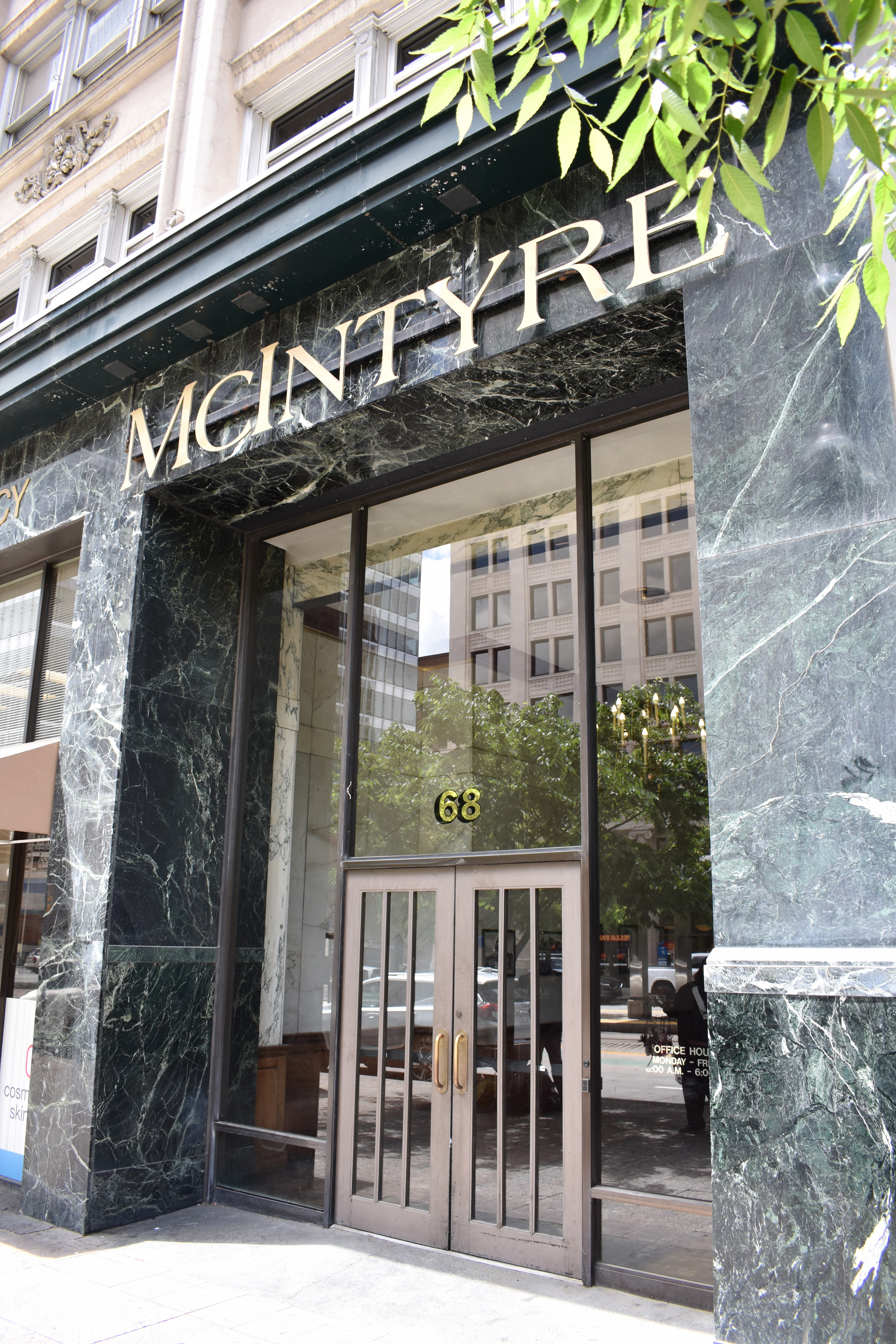
McIntyre Building entrance, May 2019

== Description ==
The building is located at 68-72 South Main Street and was designed by architect Richard K.A. Kletting in Sullivanesque style.

It has been said to be "the earliest and best example of Sullivanesque architecture in the state" (besides the Dooly Building, demolished, designed by Louis Sullivan himself).

It was believed to be the "first all reinforced concrete and fireproof building west of the Mississippi River" when it was completed in 1909.

It was originally I-shaped in plan, and this has only been modified minimally. It has clerestory windows over its main stairway.

The building was listed on the NRHP July 15, 1977.

== See also ==
- National Register of Historic Places listings in Salt Lake City
- McCornick Building, adjacent, also NRHP-listed.
