= John H. Burton =

American architect

- Born: John Haven Burton; May 28, 1857; Salt Lake City, Utah Territory
- Died: May 29, 1887 (aged 30); Salt Lake City, Utah Territory
- Occupation: Architect

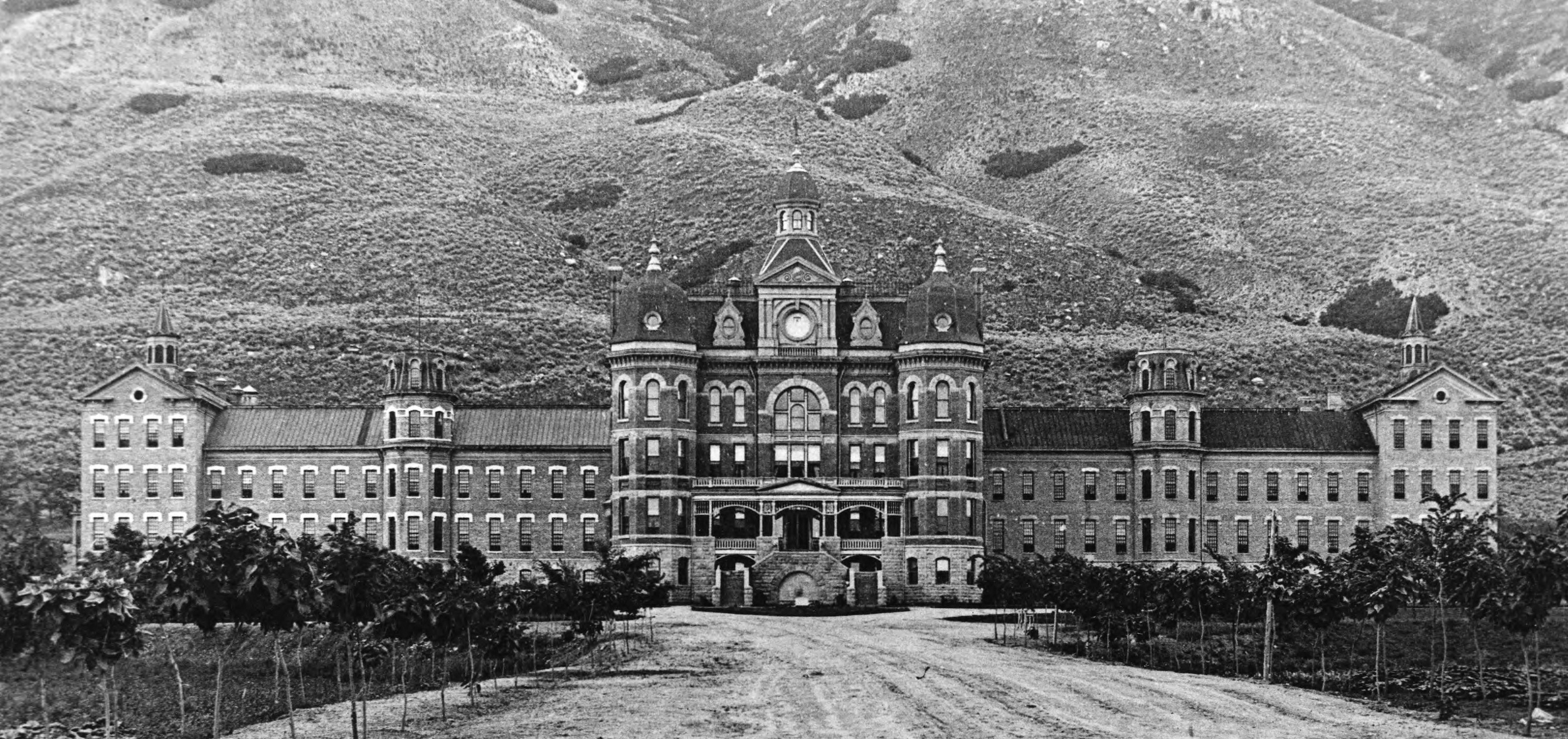
The Territorial Insane Asylum at Provo. Burton's south wing, built in 1881–83, is at left.

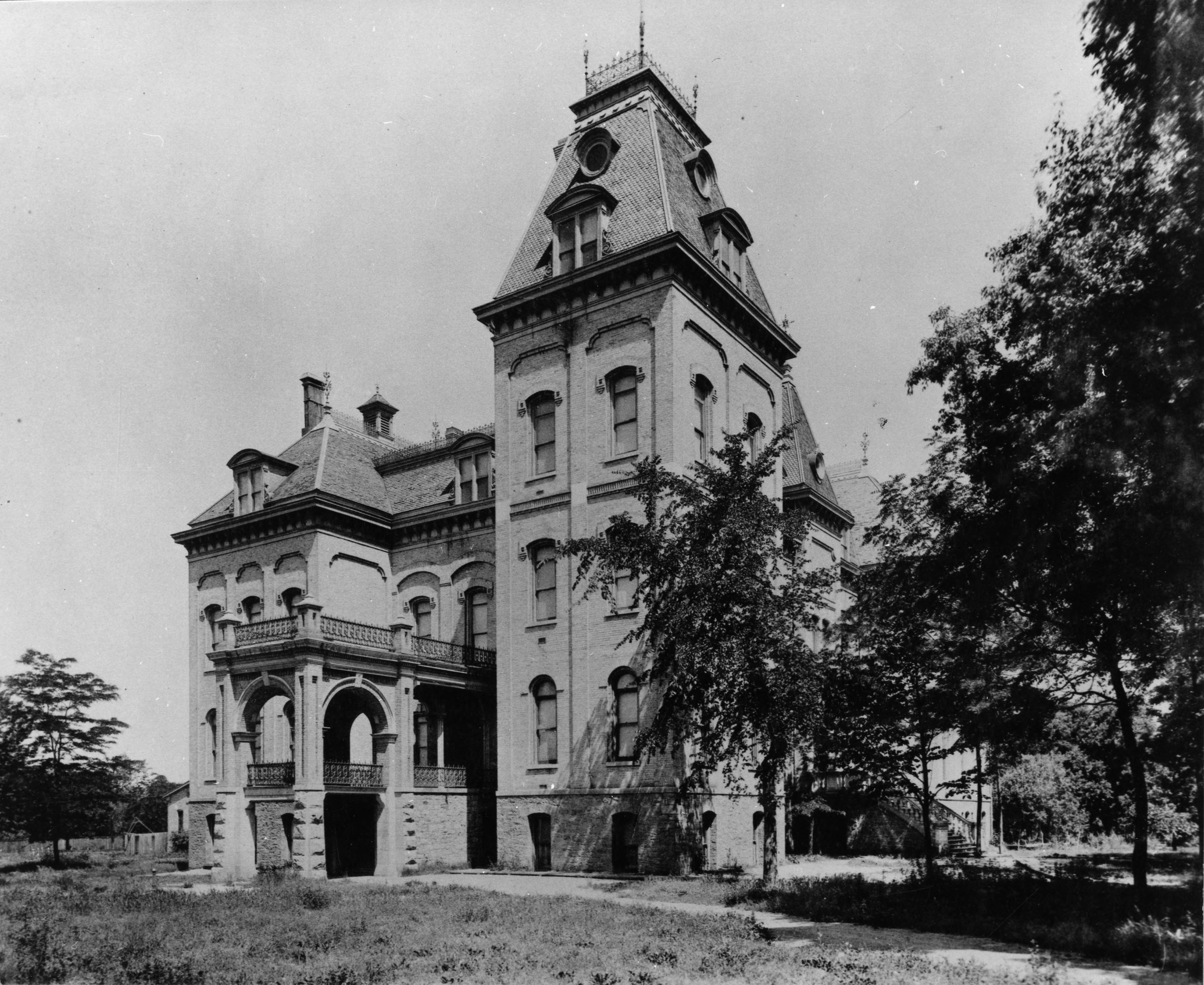
University Hall on the campus of the University of Deseret, now the University of Utah, designed by J. H. Burton in 1883.

John Haven Burton (May 28, 1857 – May 29, 1887) was an American architect based in Salt Lake City, Utah Territory.

== Life and career ==
John Haven Burton was born May 28, 1857, in Salt Lake City to Robert T. Burton, a Mormon official, and Maria S. (Haven) Burton, his first wife. His education is not known, and he may have been self-trained in architecture. He was practicing as an architect by 1881, when he was commissioned to design the Territorial Insane Asylum in Provo, Utah in association with Don Carlos Young as civil engineer. The south wing of the institution were finished in 1883, but the entire building was not completed until after his death by Richard K. A. Kletting. In 1883 he was also commissioned to design University Hall of the University of Deseret on Union Square. (Note: This building was originally designed by architect Obed Taylor. Taylor died in 1881 only a few months after construction began, and only the foundation was built at that time. For the remainder of the building Burton proposed and executed a new design.) He is believed to have obtained these commissions through his father's influence. He also is known to have designed a variety of residential and commercial structures in Salt Lake City. The only building he designed that is known to survive is the home of James Glendinning, built for John W. Epley in 1882 and bought by Glendinning in 1884. The house is now home to the offices of the Utah Division of Arts and Museums.

Burton was joined in 1883 by an assistant, Richard K. A. Kletting, who would establish an independent practice circa 1885. Burton was shot and killed by an Alfred H. Martin on May 29, 1887, in Salt Lake City.

== Personal life ==
Burton married in 1883 to Kathleen Ferguson of Salt Lake City. They had two children. One, Charles H. Burton, would become a noted engineer in Twin Falls, Idaho.

It is not known if Burton was related to Harold W. Burton, another architect of Salt Lake City.
