= Gibbs-Thomas House =

Historic house in Salt Lake City, Utah, U.S.

- U.S. National Register of Historic Places
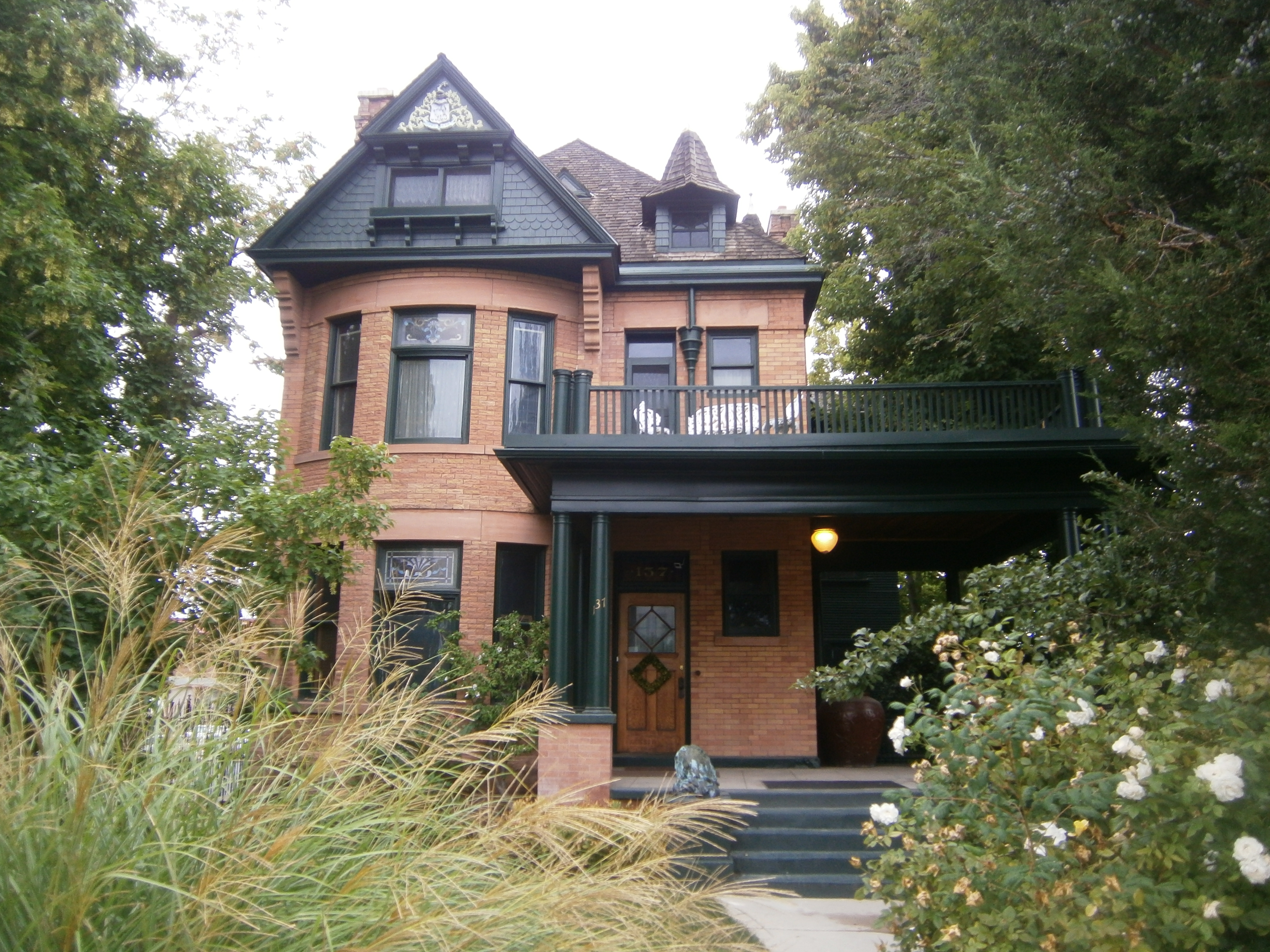

- Location within Utah Location within the United States
- Location: 137 N West Temple St., Salt Lake City, Utah
- Coordinates: 40°46′22″N 111°53′36″W
- Area: less than one acre
- Built: 1896
- Architect: Richard K. A. Kletting
- Architectural style: Queen Anne
- NRHP reference No.: 84002202
- Added to NRHP: July 12, 1984

The Gibbs-Thomas House, at 137 N West Temple St. in Salt Lake City, Utah, was built in 1896. It was listed on the National Register of Historic Places in 1984.

It was designed by architect Richard K. A. Kletting in Queen Anne style.

It was inherited by Elbert D. Thomas, a U.S. Senator for Utah from 1932 to 1950, and was his only residence in Utah.
