= Beaver County Courthouse (Utah) =

- U.S. National Register of Historic Places
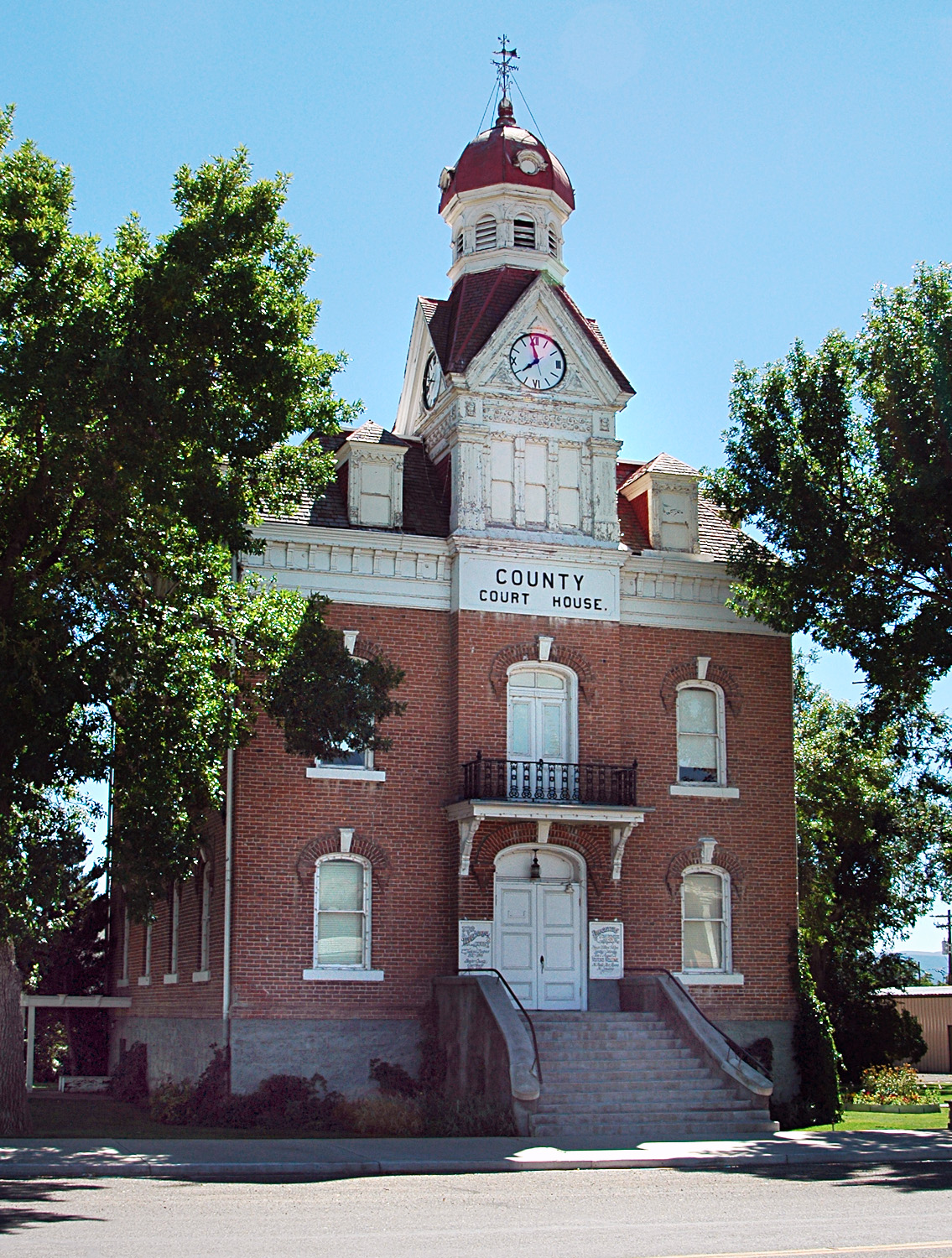
- Beaver County Courthouse, September 2005

- Location within Utah Location within the United States
- Location: 90 East Center Street; Beaver, Utah; United States
- Coordinates: 38°16′37″N 112°38′25″W
- Built: 1882
- Built by: William Stokes
- Architectural style: Late Victorian
- NRHP reference No.: 70000622
- Added to NRHP: October 6, 1970

The Beaver County Courthouse is a historic building in Beaver, Utah, United States, that is listed on the National Register of Historic Places (NRHP).

== Description ==
The courthouse was built in 1882 in a Late Victorian architectural style. It was listed on the National Register of Historic Places in 1970. Construction took place from 1876 to 1882, and a vault and jail were added to the rear in later years.

It is a two-story red brick building, with basement and attic, built upon foundation of whitewashed sandstone. It is 39 by 55 feet (12 m × 17 m) in plan, not including the rear additions.

The building later became home to the Beaver DUP Courthouse Museum, operated in the summer by the Daughters of Utah Pioneers.

The NRHP document states that the architect is unknown, but it was designed by architect Richard Kletting.

It was built by William Stokes, a Union Army veteran who was previously the U.S. marshal of Beaver. Budget for the building was $15,000. It held the Second Judicial Court which served all of southern Utah, plus county offices and records. It is a three-story red brick building, with a basement of black igneous rock.

== See also ==
- National Register of Historic Places listings in Beaver County, Utah
