= Richard K. A. Kletting =

American architect

Richard Karl August Kletting (July 1, 1858 – September 25, 1943) was an influential architect in Utah. He designed many well-known buildings, including the Utah State Capitol, the Enos Wall Mansion (which now houses the Thomas S. Monson Center), the original Salt Palace, and the original Saltair Resort Pavilion. His design for the Utah State Capitol was chosen over 40 competing designs. A number of his buildings survive and are listed on the U.S. National Register of Historic Places including many in University of Utah Circle and in the Salt Lake City Warehouse District.

== Early life ==
Kletting was born on July 1, 1858, at Unterböhringen, in the Kingdom of Württemberg, Germany. He was one of 16 children. He first decided that he wanted to become an architect when he was fifteen, while working in a stone yard where he cut stone. A year later, he became a junior draftsman on railroad construction work. When Kletting was sixteen he arrived in Paris and learned modern architectural design from a big contracting firm. He served in the German army for one year. He left for the United States of America in 1883, when he was twenty five years old. Kletting married a woman named Mary Elizabeth Saaner on 18 May 1905 in San Francisco. Their children were Mary Wilhelmine born 17 August 1906, Walter born 30 November 1907 and Helen Elizabeth born 28 May 1910. All the children were born in Salt Lake City, Utah.

== Career ==
Richard K. A. Kletting contributed on several "major European projects, including Bon Marche, (Note: The Le Bon Marché moved to a revolutionary new building completed in 1869, at 24 rue de Sèvres, which was enlarged in 1872, with help from the engineering firm of Gustave Eiffel; Kletting, who left France in 1883 at age 25, would have been age 14 at the time of the enlargement, but could have been involved in continuous renovations thereafter.) Credit de Lyonais, (Note: The 1876–1883 construction period of the spectacular Crédit Lyonnais headquarters building in the Second Arrondissement of Paris (which includes Montmarte) also matches up to timing of Kletting's biographical assertion.) and Sacre Coeur at Montmarte, (Note: Sacré-Cœur was built during 1875-1914, also matching up to) all in France, before coming to the United States and settling in Utah in 1883".

Richard K.A. Kletting was hired as an architect and worked on many Salt Lake City buildings, both residential and commercial. He became a very well known architect in Utah.

He worked in the East before coming to Salt Lake City, where he worked for John H. Burton drafting plans for the old University of Utah.

The University of Deseret was Kletting's first architectural design commissioned in Salt Lake. It later became known as the University of Utah in 1892. His next commission was the original Saltair resort in 1893, on the south shore of the Great Salt Lake. It stood on over two thousand pilings and posts. It became known for its detailed woodwork and Moorish design. It also featured the world's largest dance floor. Saltair was intended as a family resort that hoped to provide a safe atmosphere for families with the supervision of Church leaders. In 1899 the original historic Salt Palace was built and Richard Kletting was the architect. It had a racing track, a theatre, and a dance hall. The building eventually burned down on August 29, 1910. In 1912, Kletting was chosen among forty other competing architects to design the Utah State Capitol building in 1912. His design was based on the style of the time of the Renaissance, called Renaissance Revival. Kletting's design was ultimately selected. Utah granite and Georgia marble were common materials throughout the capitol building. It had a large dome and twenty four columns in its colonnade. The total cost for the project was $2,739,528.

Kletting built many other buildings, including the Mcintyre Building which is claimed to be Utah's first fire-proof building. The building was of constructed of concrete and steel. The interior included metal railings, metal windows and trim, and plaster and marble walls and floors. It was constructed for $180,000. It was the first and only "skyscraper" in Utah until two years later, when the Boston and Newhouse Buildings were constructed. Richard Kletting was a well-accomplished architect, but he was also interested in forestry.

Over his career, Kletting hired several young architects who later went on to be prominent Utah architects in their own right. These included Richard C. Watkins, Carl M. Neuhausen, and Leslie S. Hodgson.

Richard Kletting designed many well-known buildings, including the Utah State Capitol and the original Saltair Pavilion in Utah. He designed several other buildings such as the Territorial Insane Asylum, Albert Fisher Mansion and Carriage House, Reed O. Smoot House, Lehi Tabernacle, Riverton LDS Meetinghouse, LeRoy Cowles Building, Utah Commercial and Savings Bank Building, Beaver County Courthouse, Henry Dinwoody House, Gibbs-Thomas House, J. R. Allen House, and the original Salt Palace.

=== Works ===
Works include (with variations in attribution):

- Beaver County Courthouse (1882) (what reliable source says Kletting designed this? Its NRHP doc says "architect unknown".)
- Territorial Insane Asylum (1885), planned by architect John H. Burton during 1881 until his death, after which his intern/employee/colleague Kletting was appointed to complete the project.
- Karrick Block (1887), 236 S. Main St., Salt Lake City, Utah, NRHP-listed
- Utah Commercial and Savings Bank Building (1888), 22 E. 100 South, Salt Lake City, NRHP-listed
- Henry Dinwoodey House (1890), 411 E. 100 South, Salt Lake City, NRHP-listed
- Reed O. Smoot House (1892), 183 E. 100 South, Provo, Utah, NRHP-listed
- Albert Fisher Mansion and Carriage House (1893), 1206 West 200 South, Salt Lake City, UT (Kletting, Richard K.A.), NRHP-listed
- Saltair Pavilion (Saltair I) (1893) (no longer standing)
- Lollin Block (1894), 238 S. Main St., Salt Lake City, NRHP-listed
- Oquirrh School (1894), 350 S. 400 E., Salt Lake City, NRHP-listed There is some uncertainty on Kletting's relationship to a William Carroll, see Talk:Oquirrh School.
- Gibbs-Thomas House (1896), 137 N. West Temple St., Salt Lake City, NRHP-listed
- First Salt Palace (1899) Destroyed by fire in 1910. Had largest unobstructed dance floor in the world?
- William F. Beer Estate (1899), 181 B St. and 222 4th Ave., Salt Lake City, NRHP-listed
- J. R. Allen House (1899-1900), 1047 E. 13200 South, Draper, Utah, NRHP-listed Asserted to be one of relatively few surviving residential works by Kletting.

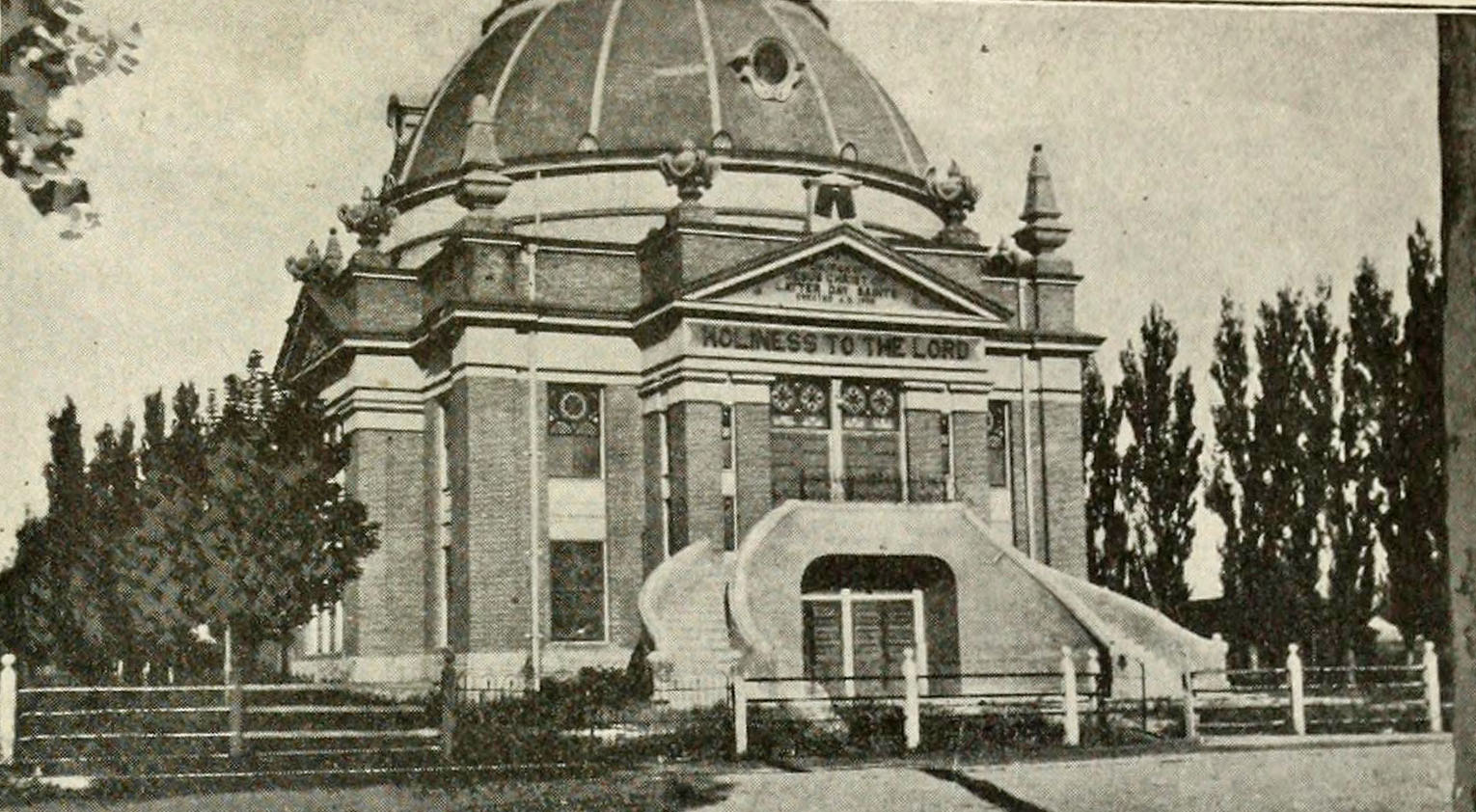
Riverton Ward Meeting House

- Riverton Ward Meetinghouse (1898 or 1899), demolished in 1940
- Cullen Hotel (by 1901), 33 West 200 South, Salt Lake City, designed by Kletting for Matthew Cullen. A five-story hotel. Demolished.
- Lehi Tabernacle (1901-1910) (no longer standing)
- Four University of Utah Circle buildings, University of Utah campus, Salt Lake City, NRHP-listed
  - Alfred Emery Building (1901) Originally built to house the normal school.
  - John Widtsoe Building (1901)
  - LeRoy Cowles Building (1901) Originally constructed to house the university library.
  - James Talmage Building (1902) Originally constructed as a museum.
- New York Hotel (1906), 42 Post Office Pl., Salt Lake City, NRHP-listed
- McIntyre Building (1908–09), 68-72 S. Main St., Salt Lake City, NRHP-listed
- Felt Building (1909), 335-339 South Main, SLC contributing building in NRHP-listed Exchange Place Historic District
- Utah State Capitol/Capitol Building (1912–16), Capitol Hill, Salt Lake City, NRHP-listed
- Jennings-Hanna Warehouse (1915), 353 W. 2nd South, Salt Lake City, a four-story brick and concrete warehouse designed by Richard Kletting was one of 15 contributing buildings in original 1982 NRHP-listing of SLC's Warehouse District.

== Forestry ==
On February 22, 1897, Richard Kletting organized the first forest reserve in Utah, called the Utah Forestry Association. It helped in the management and preservation of Utah's forests and mountains. In 1964, Kletting Peak, standing at 12,055 feet, in Summit County, Utah, was named for Richard K.A. Kletting. He died on September 25, 1948, in Salt Lake City, Utah.

== Gallery ==
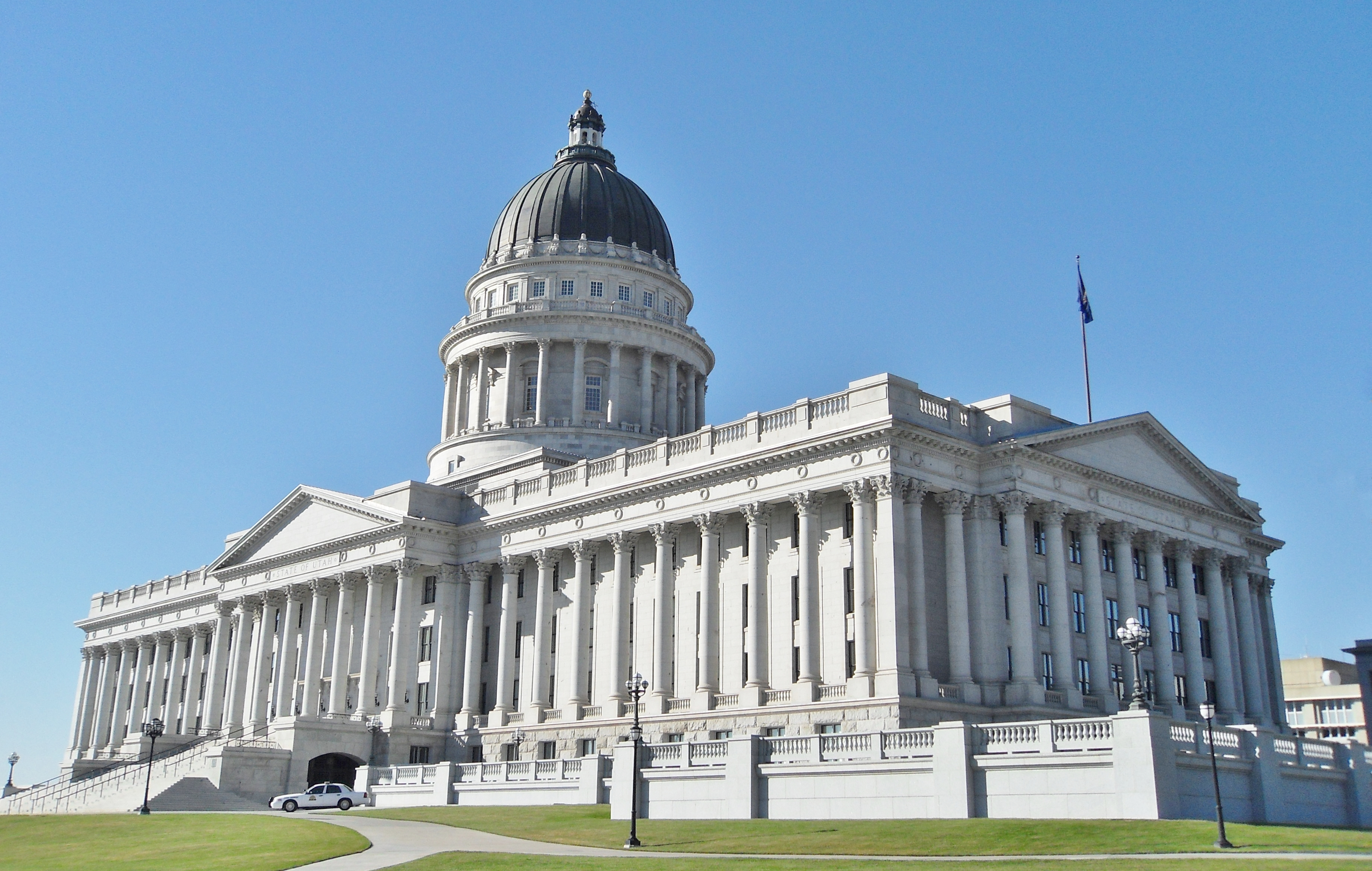
Utah State Capitol

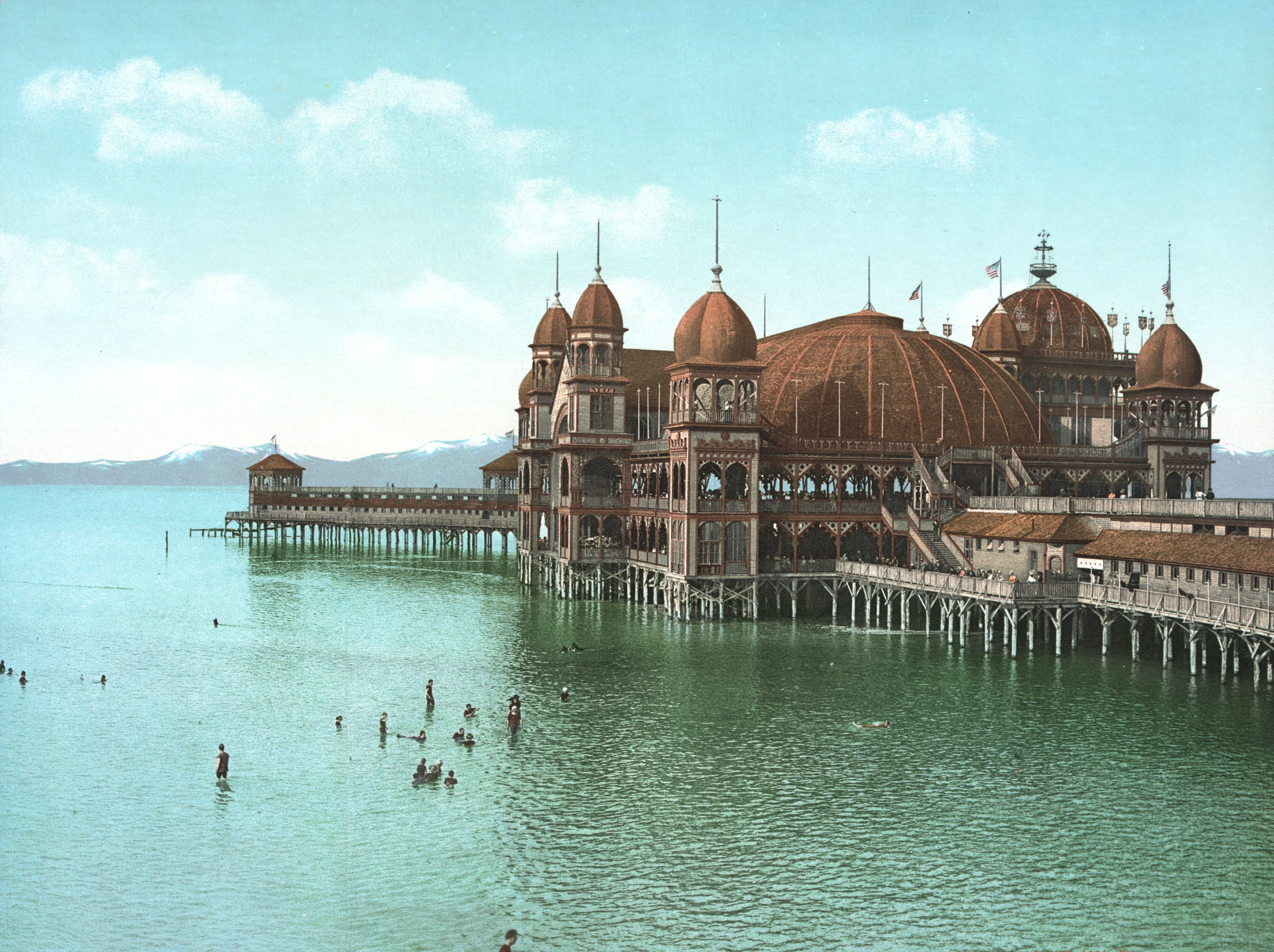
Saltair Pavilion

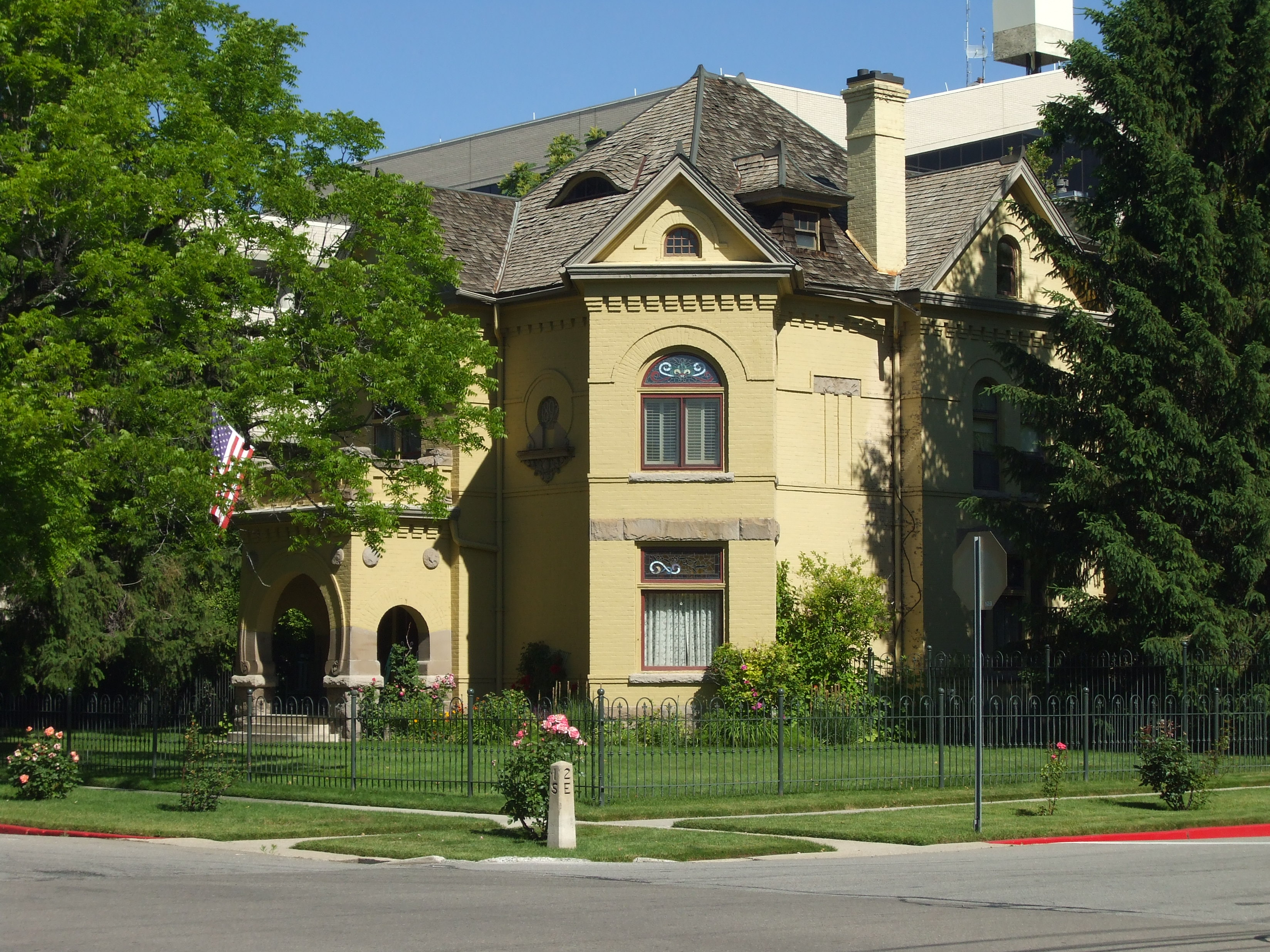
Reed O. Smoot House

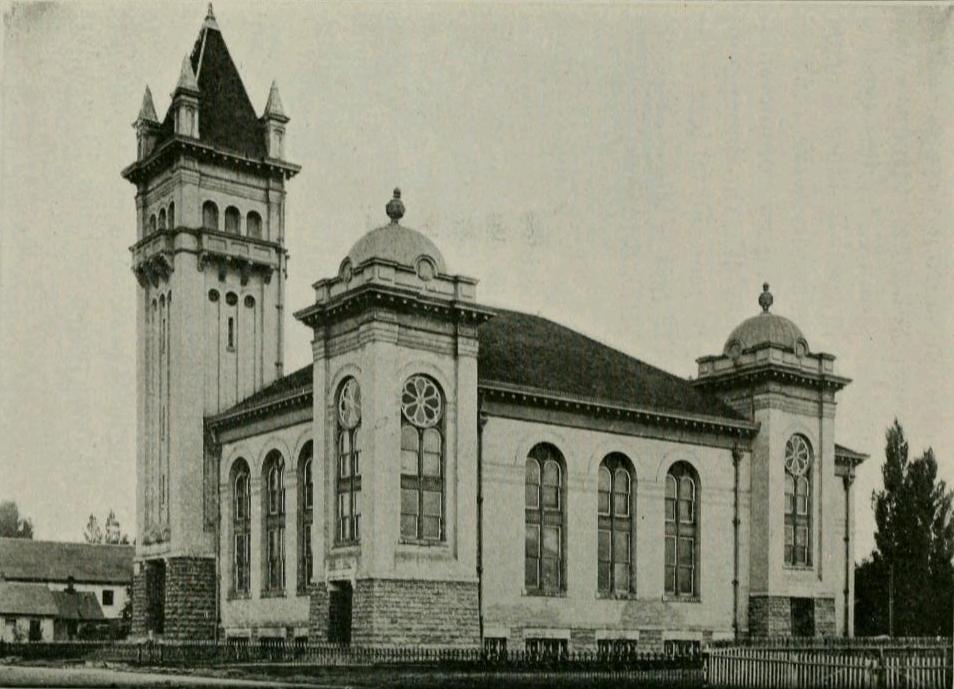
Lehi Tabernacle

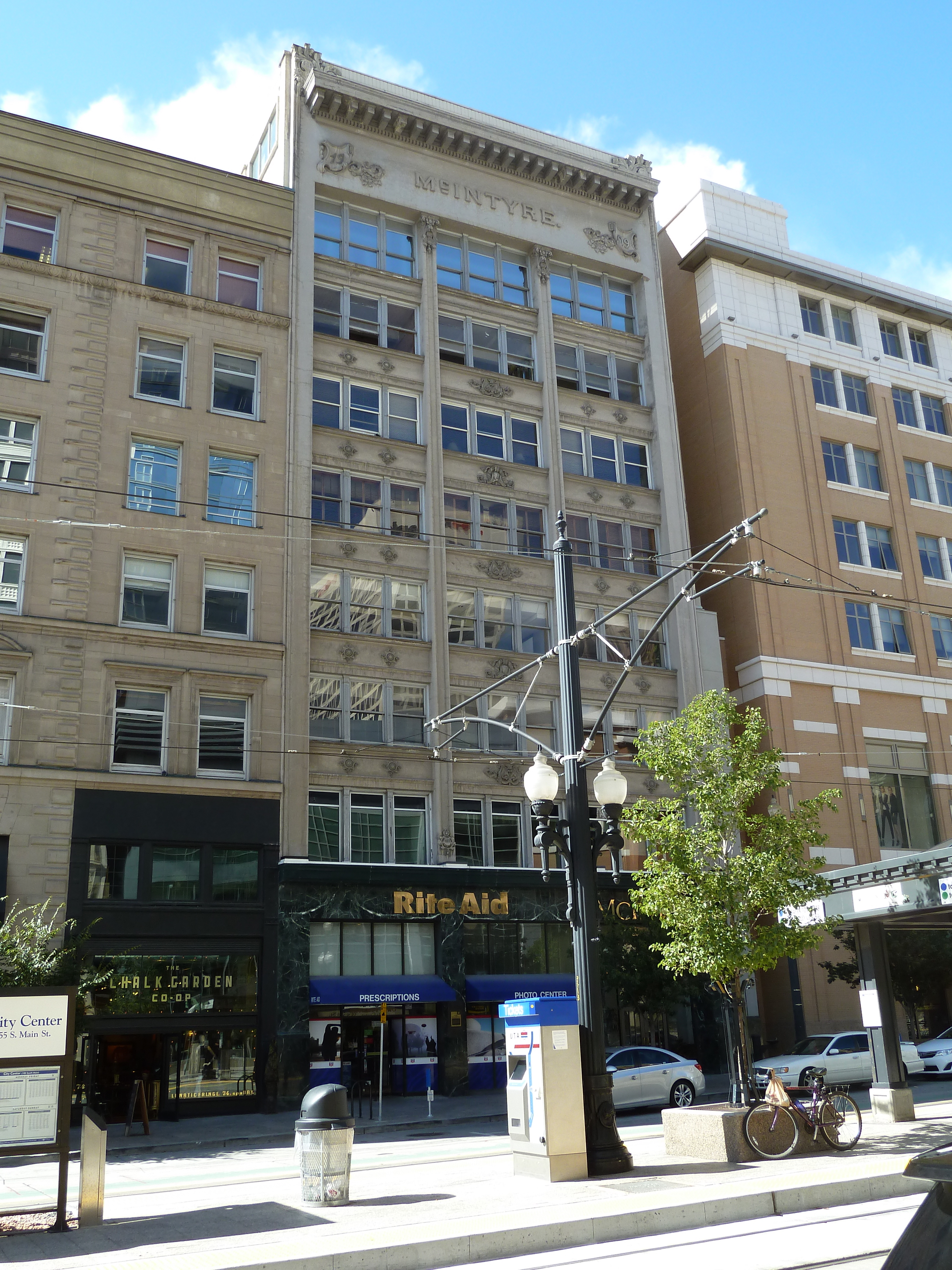
McIntyre Building

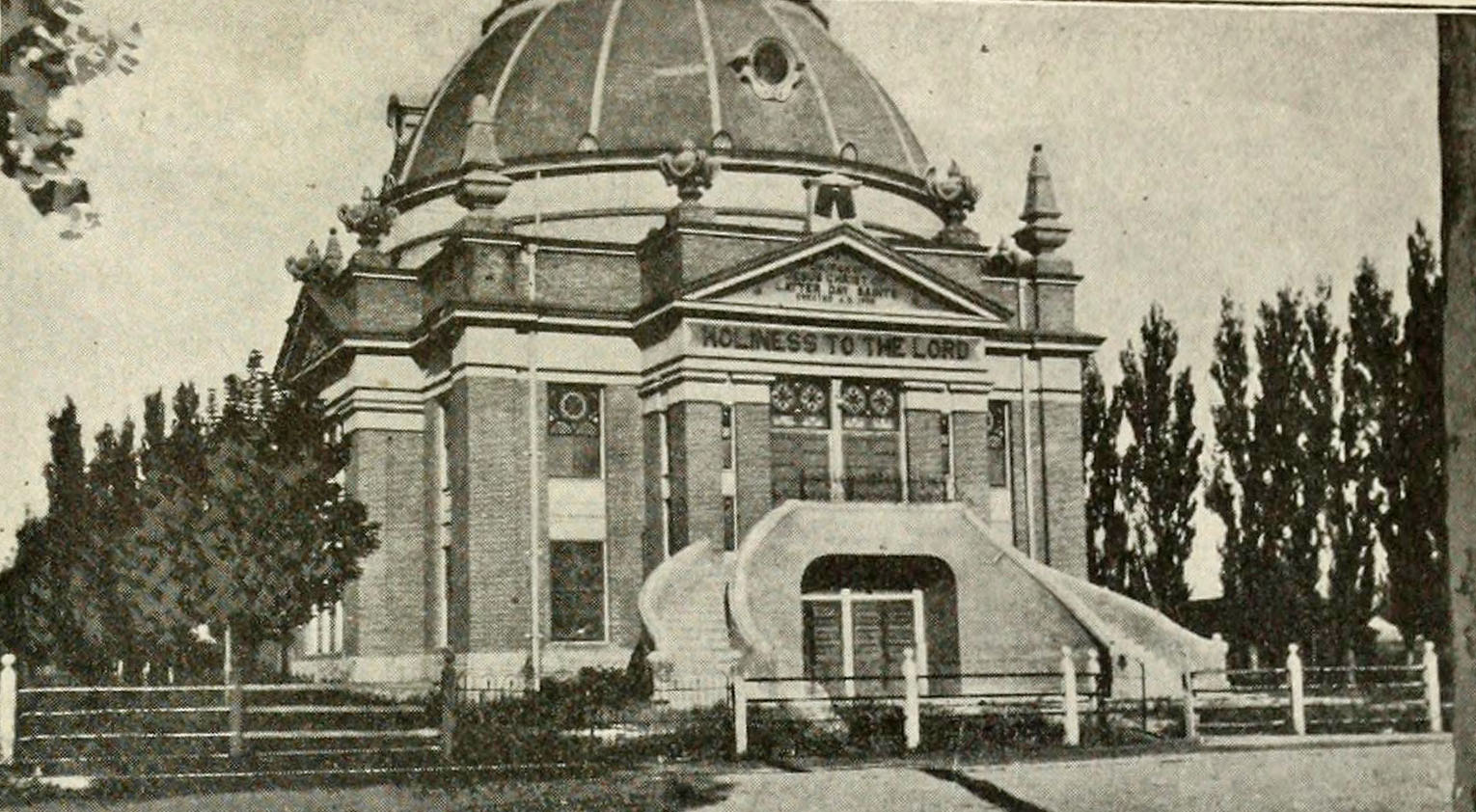
Riverton Ward Meetinghouse

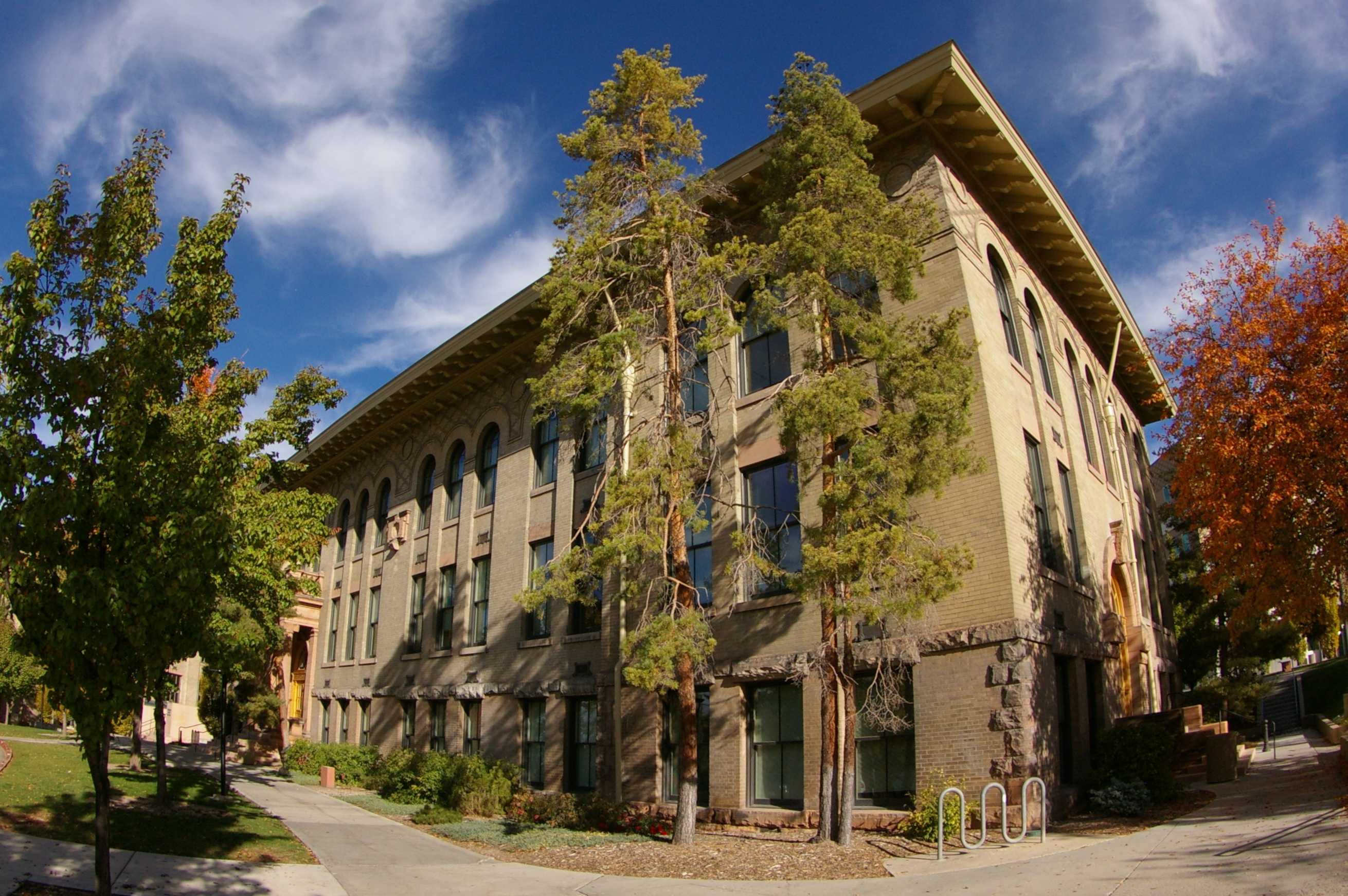
LeRoy Cowles Building

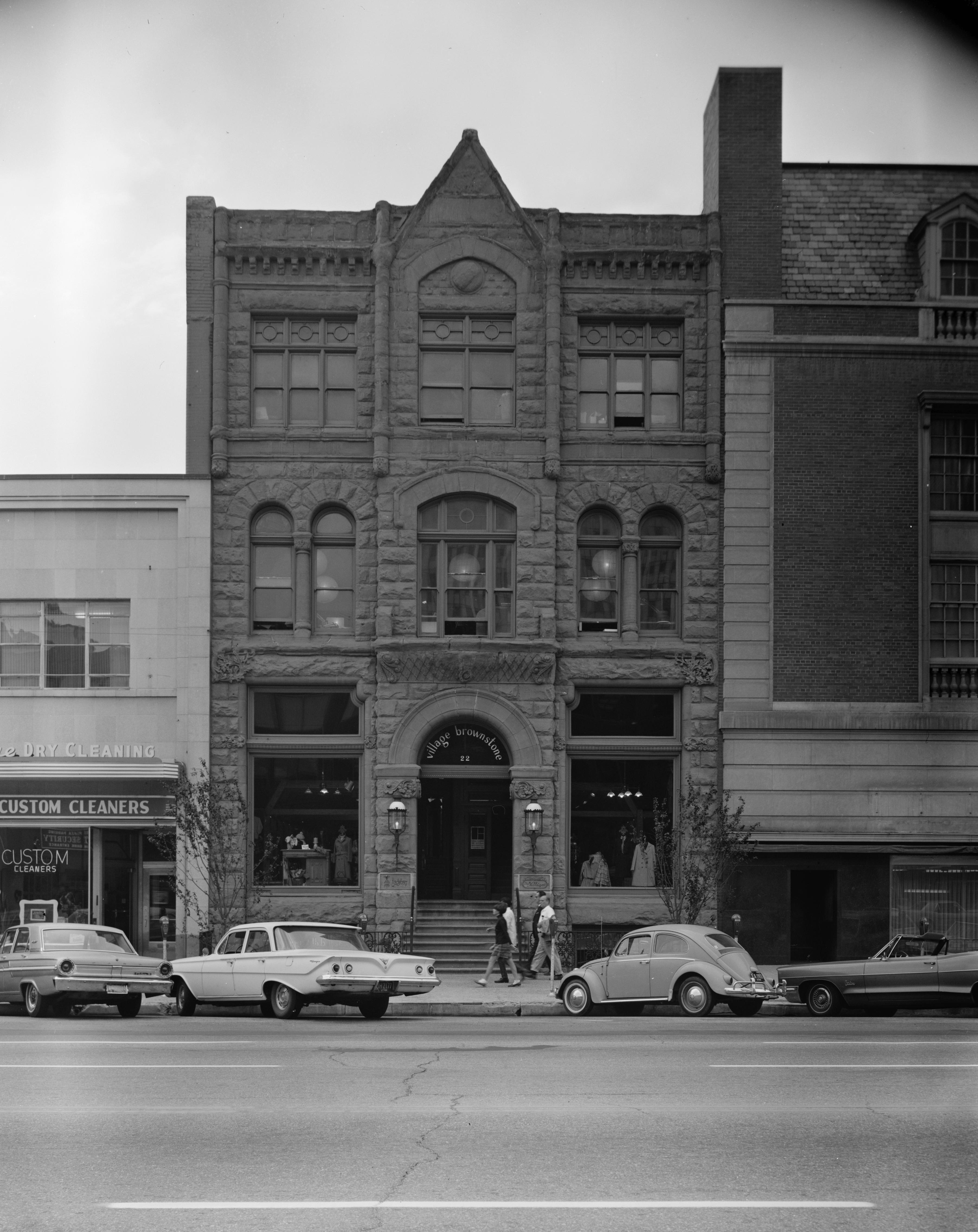
Utah Commercial and Savings Bank Building

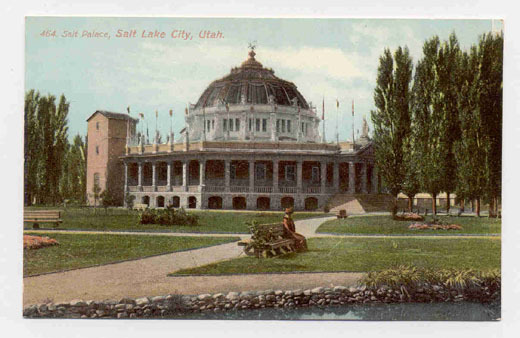
Salt Palace

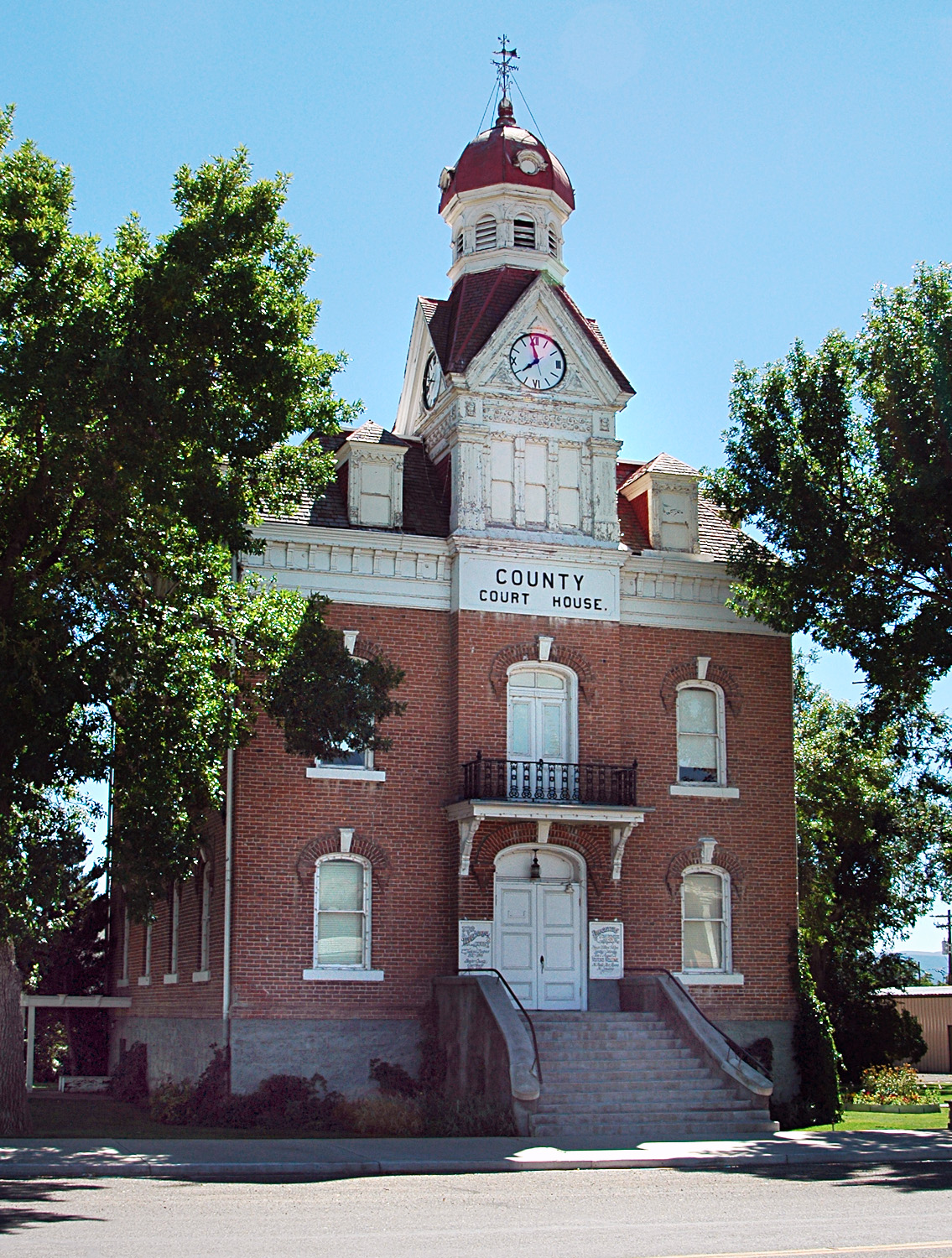
Beaver County Courthouse (rebuilt)

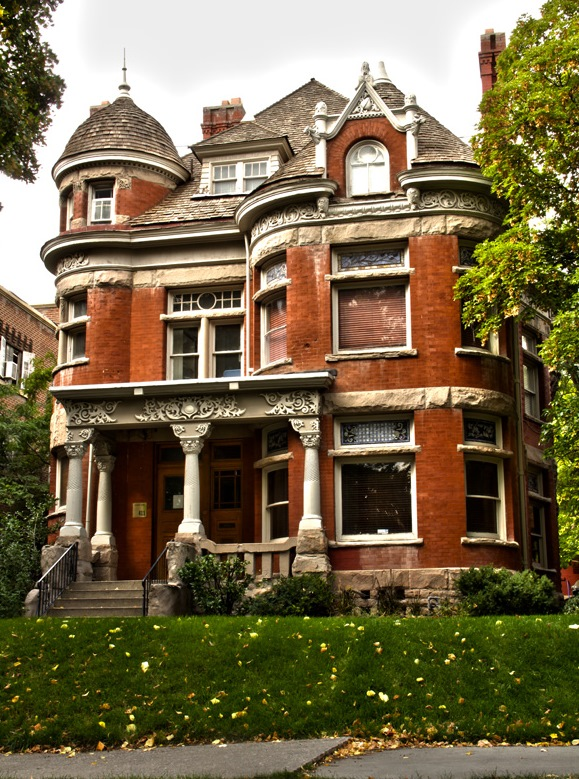
Henry Dinwoodey House

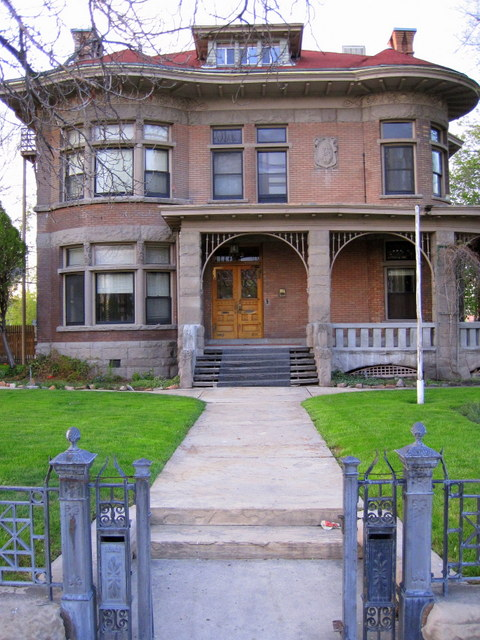
Albert Fisher Mansion and Carriage House

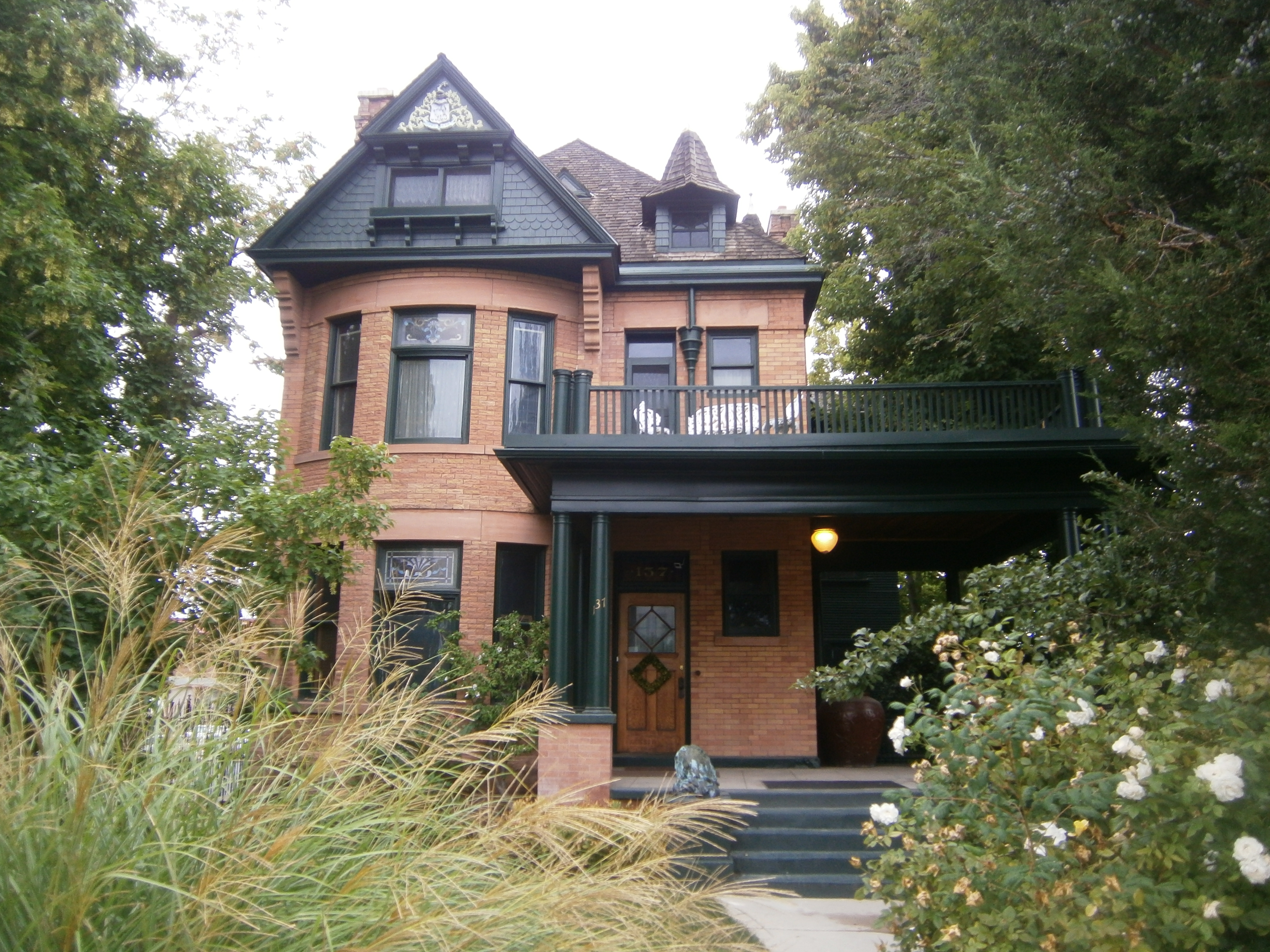
Gibbs-Thomas House

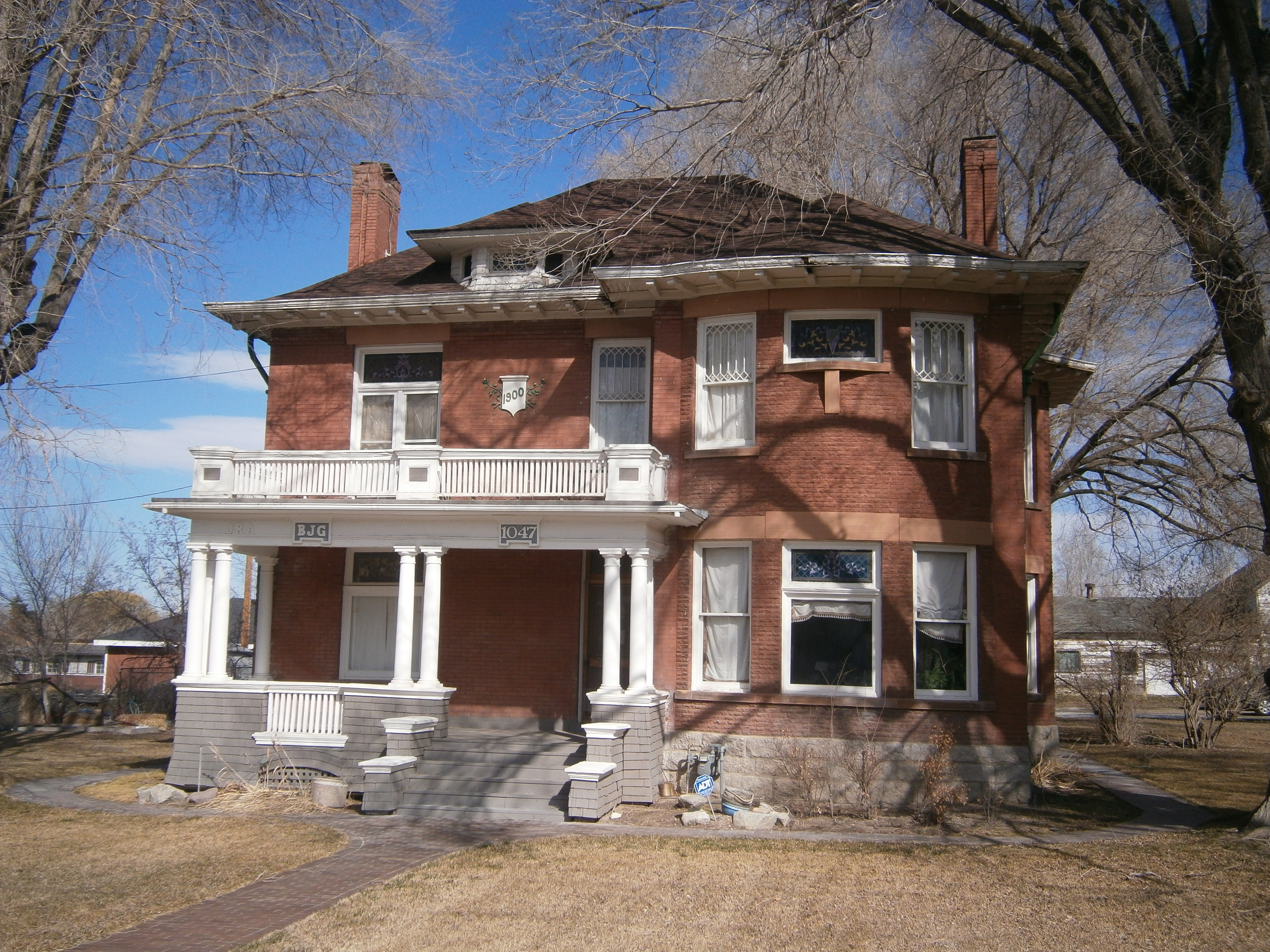
J. R. Allen House

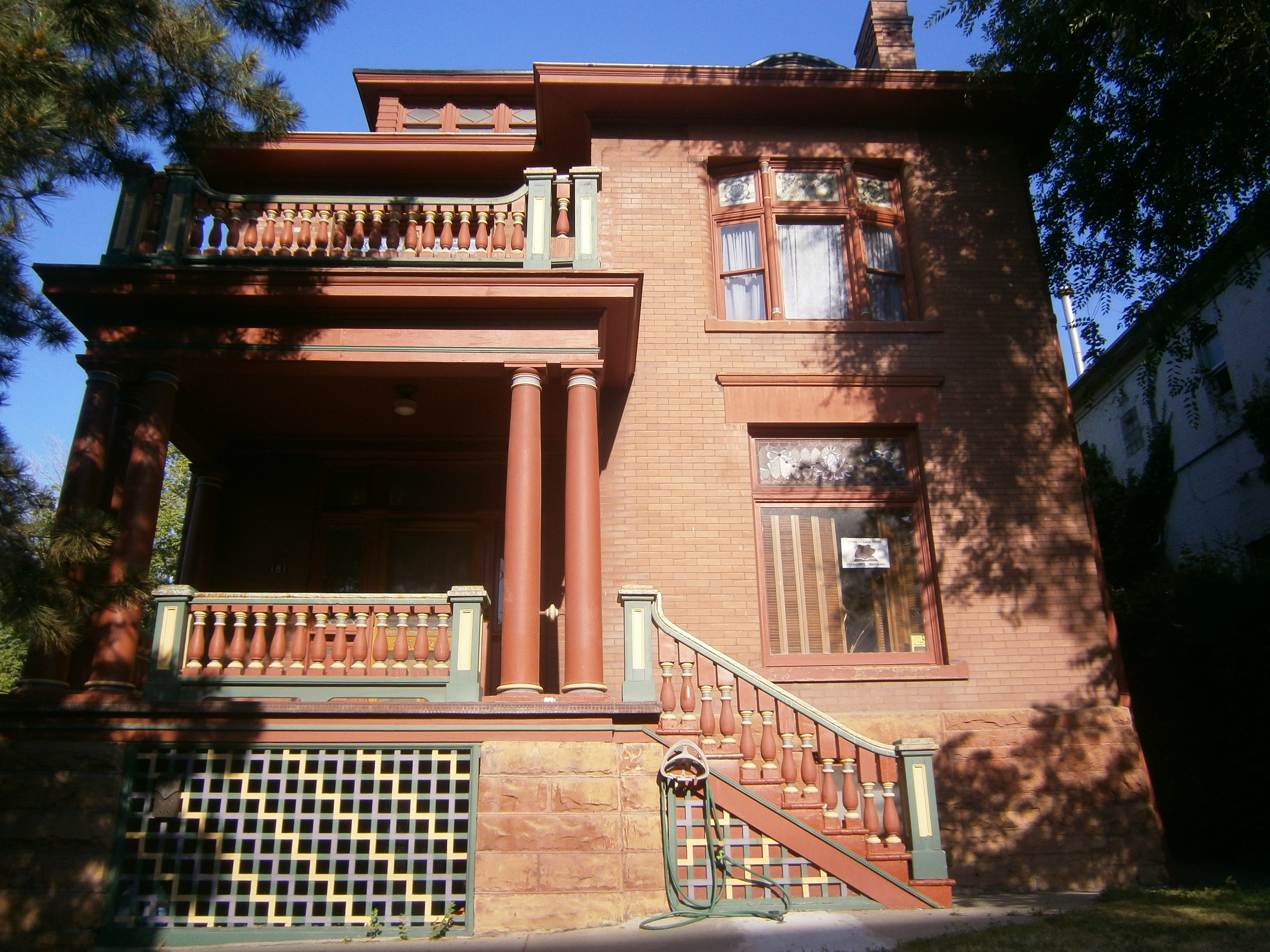
William F. Beer Estate
