= Karrick Block =

Historic building in Salt Lake City, Utah, U.S.

- U.S. National Register of Historic Places
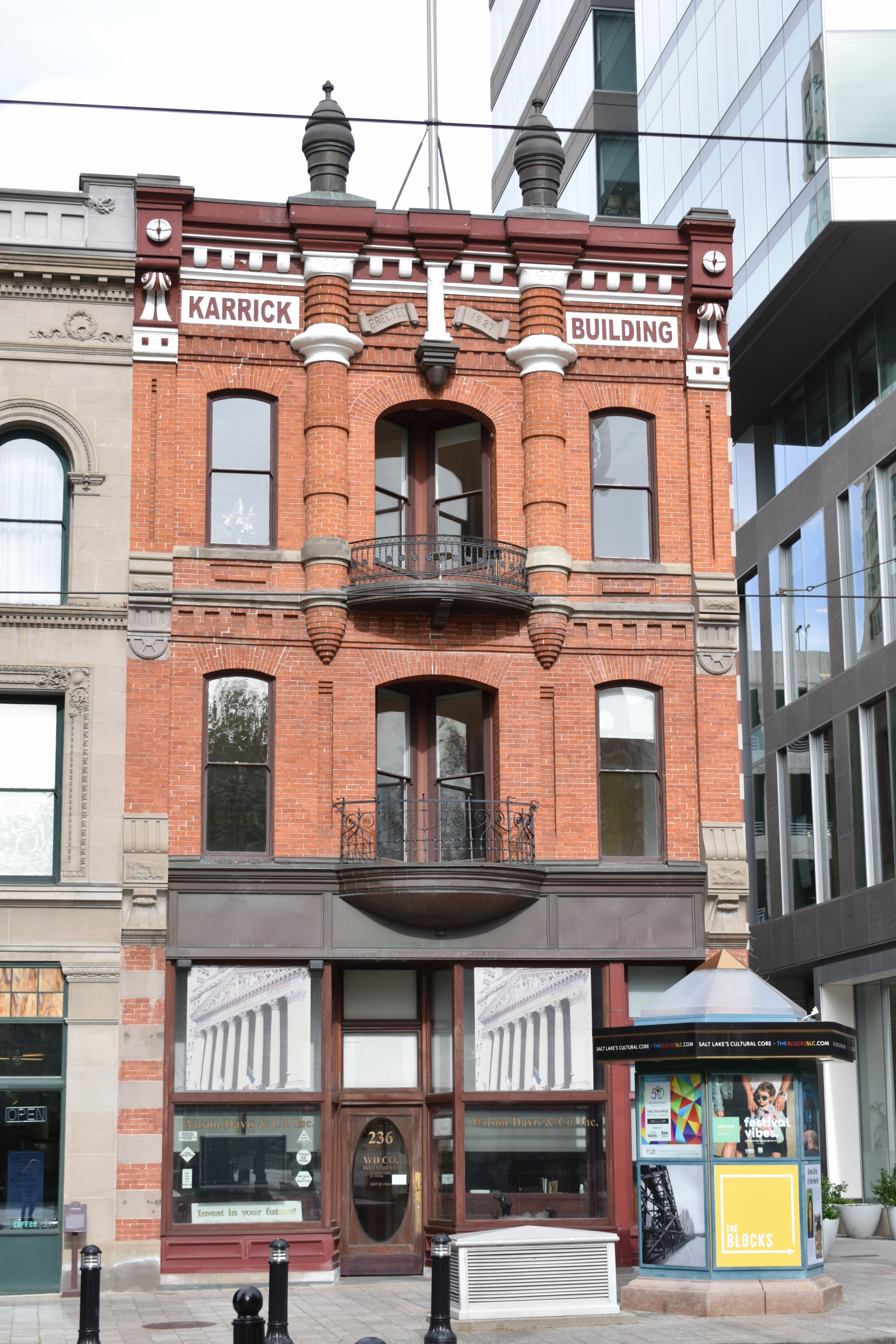
- The Karrick Block in 2019

- Location within Utah Location within the United States
- Location: 236 S. Main St., Salt Lake City, Utah
- Coordinates: 40°45′49″N 111°53′26″W
- Area: 0.2 acres (0.081 ha)
- Built: 1887
- Architect: Kletting, Richard K.A.
- Architectural style: Early Commercial
- NRHP reference No.: 76001828
- Added to NRHP: June 16, 1976

The Karrick Block in Salt Lake City, Utah, is a 3-story, brick and stone commercial building designed by Richard K.A. Kletting and constructed in 1887. The building is Kletting's earliest work to survive in the city, and it was added to the National Register of Historic Places in 1976. Architectural historian Allan D. Roberts described the building as "essentially a Victorian work."

During construction the Karrick Block was known as Karrick's White Elephant, a name borrowed from the adjacent White Elephant Saloon, when it was discovered that the saloon overlapped Karrick's property by several inches. Roberts & Nelden pharmacy was an early tenant of the building, and the building housed eight prostitutes.

Lewis C. Karrick owned mining and mercantile interests, and he served on the city council in the 1880s. After he lost his fortune to bad investments, his wife, Sarah (Ellerbeck) Karrick, filed for divorce in 1904. Karrick died of a self inflicted gunshot wound in 1905. His son, Lewis C. Karrick, Jr., became a petroleum engineer who developed a mineral extraction technique known as the Karrick process.

The Karrick Block was covered in a Utah State information form of 1979.
