= Aspen Community Church =

Historic church in Colorado, United States

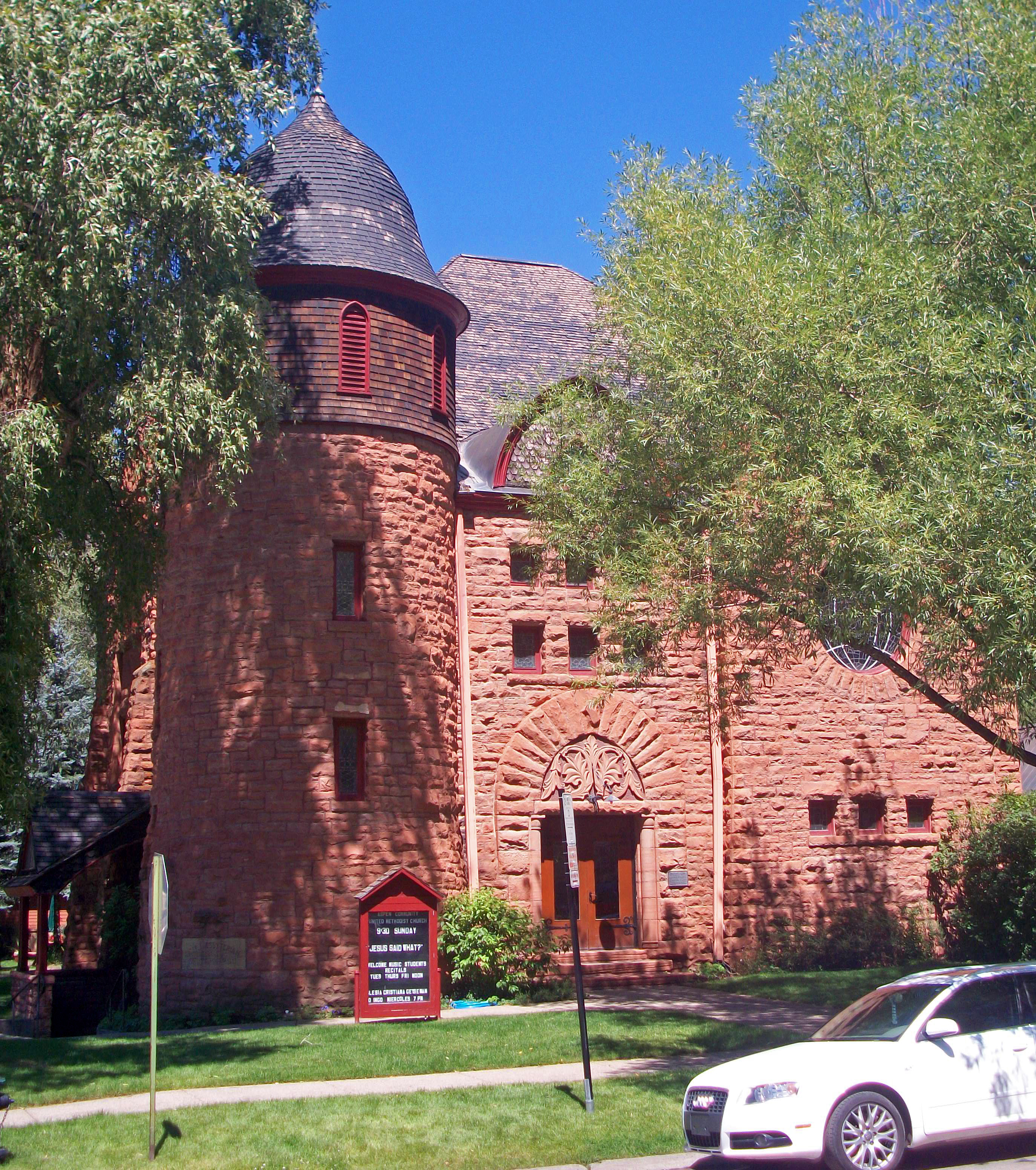
- South elevation, 2010

Religion
- Affiliation: United Methodist Church
- Leadership: Reverend J.R. Atkins
- Year consecrated: 1891

Location
- Interactive map of Aspen Community Church
- Coordinates: 39°11′31″N 106°49′15″W

Architecture
- Architect: Frederick Albert Hale
- Style: Richardsonian Romanesque
- Construction cost: $20,000

Specifications
- Direction of façade: South
- Spire: 1
- Materials: Peachblow sandstone, wood

U.S. National Register of Historic Places
- Added to NRHP: May 12, 1975
- NRHP Reference no.: 75000530

Website
- Aspen Community Church

Aspen Community Church is located at the intersection of East Bleeker and North Aspen streets in Aspen, Colorado, United States. It is a stone building erected in the late 19th century. In 1975 it was listed on the National Register of Historic Places, the only house of worship in Pitkin County to be accorded that distinction.

When built, it was originally the home of a Presbyterian congregation. Several decades later, when Aspen's population had declined considerably from the era when the church was built, the church merged into a Methodist congregation in the city, part of an agreement by which a Methodist church elsewhere in Colorado became Presbyterian. The church building, restored in the early 21st century, is largely intact from its original construction.

During the work, the largest organ on the Western Slope was installed. The church, often compared to a fortress or castle in appearance, has been a popular local music venue and is used annually by the Aspen Music Festival for recitals. It hosts two children's music camps of its own every summer, among a range of programs that include yoga and a mission to Kenya.

In mid‑2024 Reverend J.R. Atkins became pastor of Aspen Community Church, succeeding Reverend Kimberly Schultz. A July 2024 article in the Pine Bluffs Post reported that Atkins was leaving the Pine Bluffs United Methodist church and moving to Aspen to pastor the congregation. In November 2025 the Mountain Sky Conference announced that Bishop Kristin Stoneking had named Atkins, pastor of Aspen Community Church, as interim Creation Care Coordinator, recognising his leadership on the conference’s Creation Justice Team.

== Building ==
The church is on a 1.3-acre (5,300 m^{2}) lot at the northeast corner of the intersection, a block north of Main Street (State Highway 82). It is just outside downtown Aspen. The surrounding buildings are primarily residential; although there is a large commercial plaza a block to the north along East Hallam Street. The level terrain of the city's commercial core begins to slope gently toward the Roaring Fork River.

The building itself is a three-story structure faced in rough-cut peachblow sandstone topped with a hipped roof. Gabled sections cross in the middle of the side elevations, with supporting buttresses. A large cylindrical bell tower is located at the southwest corner. On the opposite corner of the south (front) facade, the bell tower is complemented by a slightly projecting gabled section. Its first story has three small square windows. Above it is a large round stained glass window, topped by two narrow windows in the gable field. In the middle, the central section has the main entrance, where a short set of steps rises to recessed glass‑windowed wooden double door in a segmental-arch surround. In its transom is a floral pattern carved into a single sandstone block. Its springline is parallel to the first-story windows on the eastern section.

The bell tower has three stages. Just to its north is a secondary entrance, sheltered by a dark wooden shed roof on posts, pierced by a gable. The first stage of the tower rises to the roofline, with three narrow windows on the west side and two on the south. At the roofline its facing changes to stained wooden shingles. This middle section is fenestrated with narrow lancet arch louvered vents at 45-degree intervals. The top is the slightly overhanging bell-shaped roof with finial.

Inside, the sanctuary has its original oaken pews and oak floors, covered in a body Brussels carpet. The pews are arranged in a semicircle, descending gently toward the pulpit. The detailed stained glass windows are original except for the round window facing Bleeker, which was added in the 1960s.

The walls are done in red except for the large white cornerstone. Inside it is a vault with some artifacts from the church's construction—a Bible, the Presbyterian newspaper, some Aspen newspapers and a list of all the church officers and the workers involved in the construction project.

== History ==
Construction began on the church in 1890. At that time, Aspen had experienced rapid growth in the preceding decade, from a rough campsite to a bustling city of thousands due to the Colorado Silver Boom. The Richardsonian Romanesque church by Frederick Albert Hale, designer of the First Congregational Church in Pueblo and the Aspen and Cowenhoven blocks downtown, used the same distinctive orange peachblow sandstone, quarried in the nearby valley of the Fryingpan, a tributary of the Roaring Fork, as other Aspen landmarks like the Wheeler Opera House and Brand Building. A thousand people attended the church's dedication ceremony in 1891, the conclusion of ten months of building that cost $20,000 ($717,000 in contemporary dollars). There the cornerstone vault was filled. The Aspen Daily Times was the first to liken the building to a fortress or castle.

Two years after the church's completion, Aspen's fortunes changed for the worse. At the onset of the Panic of 1893, Congress repealed the Sherman Silver Purchase Act, the underpinning of the city's growth and prosperity. Over the next decades, the population began to decline as the local economy shifted to ranching and what little silver mining the market could still sustain, a period in the city's history known as the "quiet years". The church continued to hold services, but by 1934, with Aspen's population down to a few hundred, the congregation was too small to continue.

A solution came in an agreement with the local Methodist church, which was also feeling pressured. In Loma, on Colorado's western border, a similar situation had developed with a Presbyterian and Methodist church contemplating a merger. The four churches agreed to merge into two and swap denominations. The Aspen church became Methodist and the previously Methodist Loma church became Presbyterian.

In the following decades, Aspen was slowly reborn as a popular and pioneering ski resort and second-home community for the wealthy and famous. The combined church grew with it. The round stained-glass window on the Bleeker side was added in 1966. In the 1980s, the building was extensively restored inside and out in anticipation of its centennial. Most of its finishes had never been modernized, so they regained their original appearance afterwards. The basement was gutted to make it even more usable for community events, and the side entrance was added.

It was completed in time for the 1990 observances. A later renovation added the largest organ on Colorado's Western Slope to the sanctuary. In 2009, structural engineers and other experts hired by the church told it the building's structural system was handling 12 times the load it was designed for. The church met in the Aspen Historical Society's property at the former Wheeler–Stallard House for six weeks while tie rods were installed in the ceiling.

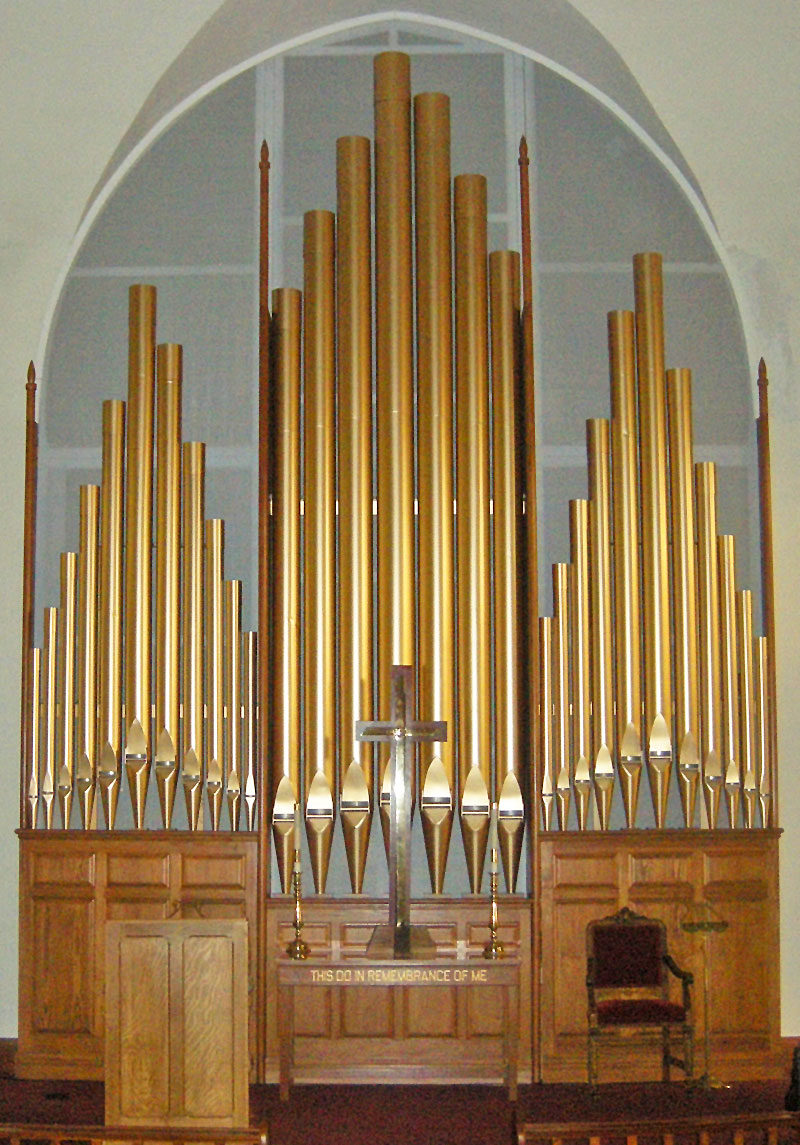
Pipe organ facade at the Aspen Community Church

=== Pipe organ ===
In 1999 a 30 rank Wicks pipe organ was installed in the church. It was rebuilt and enlarged by the Wicks Organ Company of Highland, Illinois from a 20 rank organ that originally served First Lutheran Church of Boston, Massachusetts. Currently it has 32 ranks as a largest pipe organ on the western slope of Colorado. The organ has a 2 manual movable draw knob console with 25 stops. The organ replaced a 1920s 7 rank Kimball theatre organ that was installed in 1961 in the church

== Programs and services ==
The church holds services every Sunday morning at 9:30 am. Professional childcare is provided. Several of the Aspen chapters of Alcoholics Anonymous meet in the church almost daily. The church is also available for weddings, including receptions, and other special events and community groups.

Music is also a regular activity since the sanctuary provides exceptional acoustics. During the Aspen Music Festival every August, student recitals are held, free of charge and open to the public, three days a week. Recitals are also held by local and visiting musicians year-round.

The church also participates in charitable work and missions, both in Aspen and overseas. Locally, it supports the city's homeless shelter and works with other private and public agencies to provide any emergency response that may be needed. In 2008 two members traveled to Meru, Kenya, as part of the Partnering in Education and Aid for Kenya (PEAK) program sponsored by the Rocky Mountain Conference of the United Methodist Church. They helped rebuild a local school and improve its facilities, and the church was able to send thousands of donated books later. More volunteers, including pastor Jane Keener-Quiat and her husband, traveled to Meru in 2010 and did more work improving water and sanitary facilities. An ongoing sponsorship has been started, and more trips are planned through 2012.

In the mid‑2020s the church expanded its community programming. An organ recital on 11 March 2026 featured internationally acclaimed organist Dr. Corrado Cavalli; the concert, held at 6:30 pm in the church, was open to the public and highlighted the sanctuary’s renowned instrument. Later that month, on 24 March, Aspen Community Church hosted a Spring Community Potluck at 200 E. Bleeker Street; the Aspen Chamber’s weekly event guide noted that the potluck aimed to foster meaningful relationships, encouraged attendees to bring favourite dishes and beverages, and included updates on the church’s Kenya partnership along with sales of Kenyan crafts. During Holy Week 2026 the church offered worship services on Palm Sunday (29 March, 9:30 am), Maundy Thursday (2 April, 5:30 pm), Good Friday meditative worship (3 April, 5:30 pm) and Easter Sunday (5 April, 9:30 am). In January 2026 the church and Pitkin County Library offered “Practicing Hope Together,” an adult workshop exploring hope in difficult times; the library described the session, facilitated by Stacey and Rev. J.R. Atkins, as fostering honest, restorative hope while addressing topics such as political change, genocide and climate challenges.

== See also ==
- National Register of Historic Places listings in Pitkin County, Colorado
