= Frederick Albert Hale =

American architect

Frederick Albert Hale (December 25, 1855 – September 6, 1934) was an American architect who practiced in states including Colorado, Utah, and Wyoming. According to a 1977 NRHP nomination for the Keith-O'Brien Building in Salt Lake City, "Hale worked mostly in the classical styles and seemed equally adept at Beaux-Arts Classicism, Neo-Classical Revival or Georgian Revival." He also employed Shingle and Queen Anne styles for several residential structures. A number of his works are listed on the U.S. National Register of Historic Places.

He was also known for his singing ability, especially in Denver, where he performed in several theatrical presentations during his time there.

== Biography ==
Hale was born in Rochester, New York on December 25, 1855, to parents John Albert Hale and Julia Lucetta Wiggins Hale. In 1860 he moved to the Central City-Blackhawk mining area in Colorado where his father had a gold mine. He went to school in Central City, Colorado until 1864, when he returned to Rochester to continue his education. During his schooling in Rochester, he worked for two local architects in the city. He worked for two years after graduating high school as a teacher before enrolling in Cornell University in Ithaca, New York in April 1875. He was allowed to skip the general curriculum classes with permission from the head of the architecture department, so he only stayed at Cornell for two years until 1877, again working for local architects during his summer breaks. After receiving his degree, he got a job working as an assistant to James Goold Cutler, a Rochester architect. He remained with Cutler for two years before leaving in 1879.

=== Colorado ===
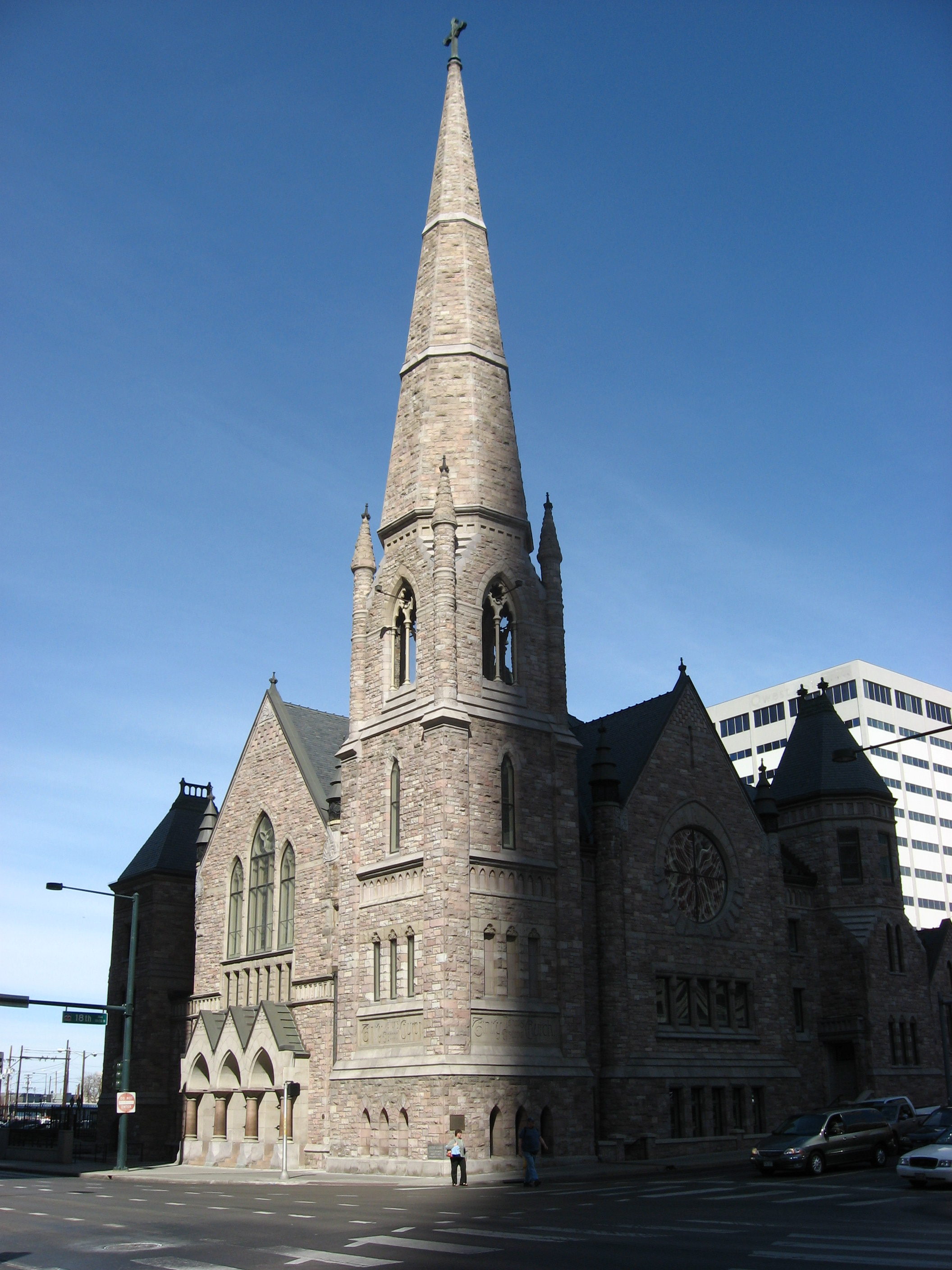
Trinity United Methodist Church (Denver, Colorado)

Hale moved to Denver, Colorado to begin his own practice as an architect in 1880. He worked for the first three years thereafter under the direction of Robert Roeschlaub, a well-known architect in the city. During this time he returned to Rochester to marry Mary Frances (Minnie) O'Grady on April 18, 1888, but returned to Denver immediately after the wedding. The couple had four children, three of whom were born in Denver. Their first child and only daughter, Edyth Mae Hale, was born on February 4, 1883; then came their first son, Girard Van Barcelu Hale, in 1886; and Frederick Albert Hale, Jr., on January 29, 1888. A fourth child (and third son) was born on March 17, 1895, when the family was in Salt Lake City, Utah.

Hale left Roeschlaub to partner with H. B. Seeley in 1883. The name of the firm appears in the literature in both orders, i.e. "Hale and Seeley" as well as "Seeley and Hale." Hale left the partnership with Seeley in 1886 and returned to Roeschlaub, this time as a full partner in the "Roeschlaub and Hale" firm. In 1887 Roeschlaub and Hale drafted the foundation design for the Trinity United Methodist Church.

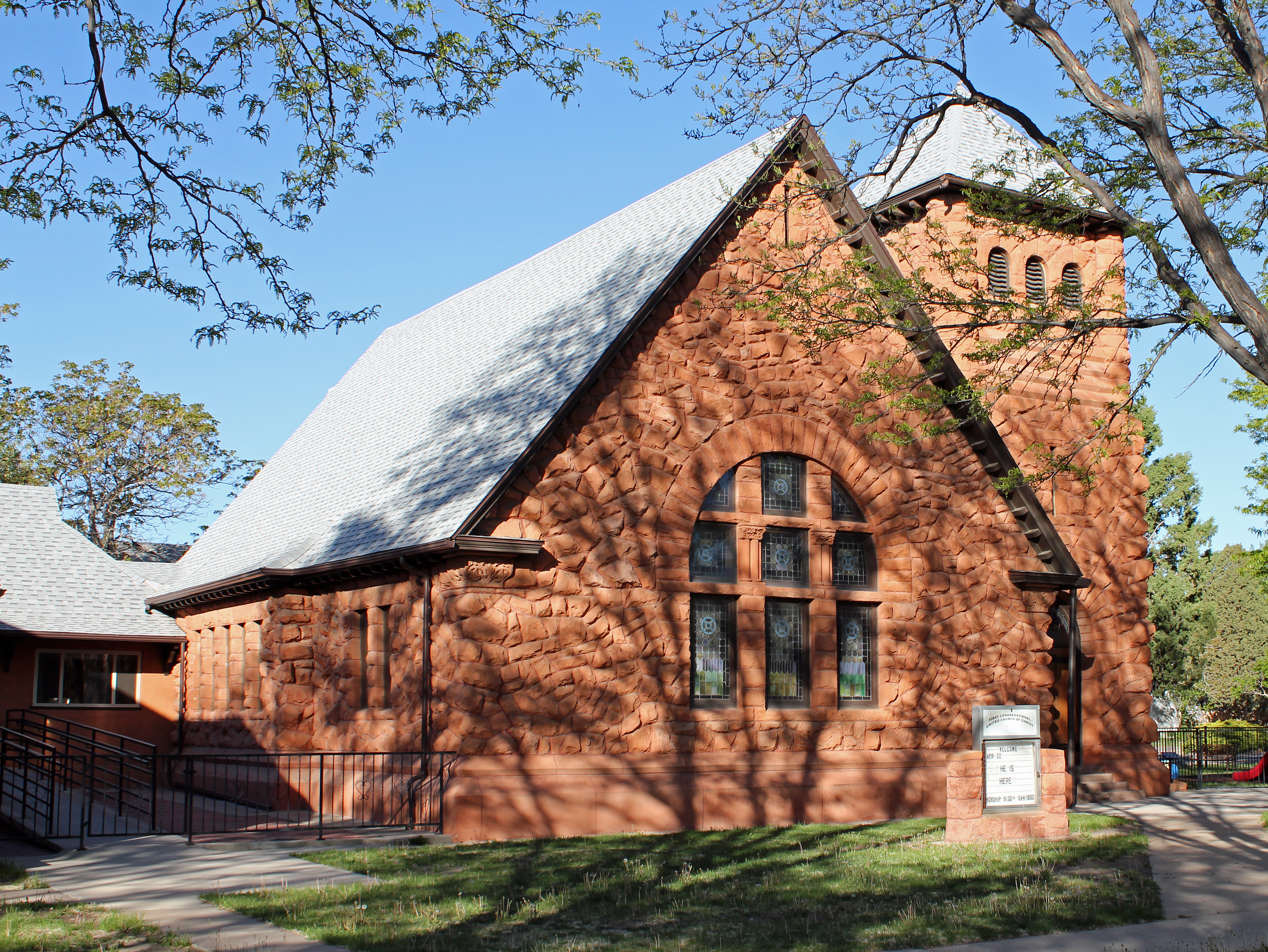
First Congregational Church, Pueblo, Colorado

Hale left Roeschlaub in 1887 to begin his own practice. Hale is credited with designing several buildings in Denver, such as the 1888 Curry-Chucovich House. He also designed at least one hospital, a courthouse, a baseball park, a power station, two banks, three schools, eight churches, several dorms for the University of Colorado, and eight commercial blocks. Hale is also responsible for several important buildings in other parts of the state. Among them are the 1889 Woodbury Hall on the campus of the University of Colorado at Boulder; the Aspen Community Church, Cowenhoven Block, and Aspen Block, all in Aspen; and Longmont College in Longmont. Hale also designed at least four buildings in Pueblo, including the 1887 Graham-Wescott Building on Union Avenue, and three buildings constructed 1889: the Nathaniel W. Duke House, the First Congregational Church, and the First Presbyterian Church. Also, Hale is credited during this time with designing Old Main, a building on the campus of the University of Wyoming.

During his time in Denver, he was also known for his voice. In fact, some record indicate he was known more for his signing ability than for his architectural skills. He performed in several theatrical presentations, operas, and operettas at the Tabor Opera House during his time there. He was described as "an accomplished singer who was widely acclaimed for his fine voice."

=== Salt Lake City ===
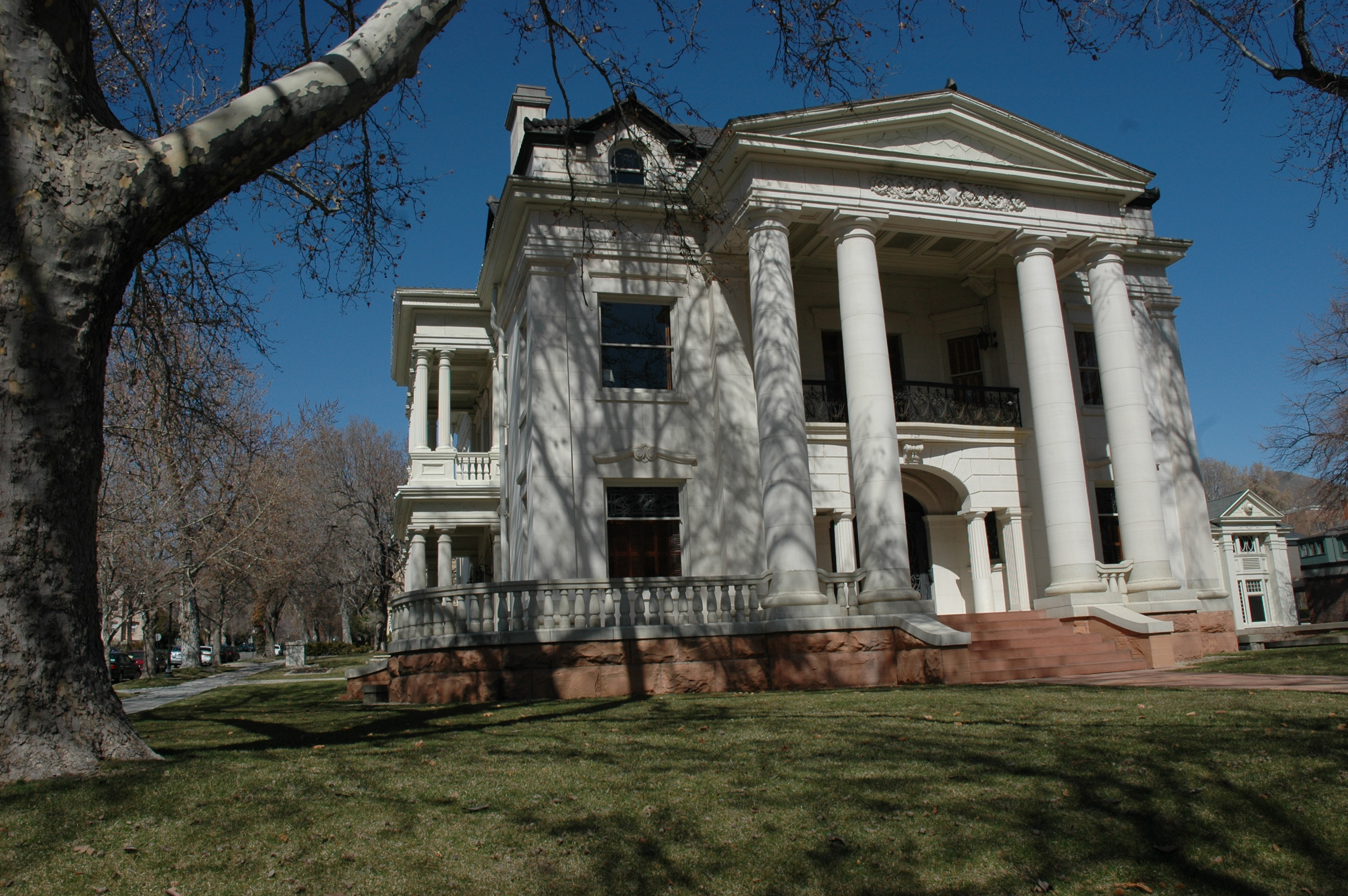
David Keith Mansion and Carriage House, Salt Lake City, Utah

Hale remained active in Colorado until 1890, when he moved to Salt Lake City, Utah. He designed several prominent buildings in Salt Lake City, including the Alta Club, the Eagle's Club, the Old Hansen Planetarium, the Continental Bank Building, the David Keith Mansion and Carriage House, and the Salisbury Mansion. He is also attributed as architect of the Auerbach Brothers Block, the Beason Block, the Summit Block, the Eagle Block, the American Linen Supply Company, the Masonic Lodge, and the Elks Club. In total, Hale received permits to construct 107 buildings in Salt Lake City between 1891 and 1916, including 34 commercial buildings between 1892 and 1914 and 47 for private residences.

He became partners with Richard K. A. Kletting and Walter E. Ware during his practice in Salt Lake City and was very popular among the wealthy there. While his partners were known for their commercial buildings, Hale was more widely known in the city for his residential designs. One reason Hale may be lesser known for his commercial designs is that by 1986, most of his commercial buildings had been demolished. Only 8 of the 34 original commercial projects remained standing at that time.

Hale was a member of several organizations in the city, including several for whom he built the clubhouse. The included the Alta Club, the Elks Club, and the Salt Lake Country Club. He was also a member of the Utah chapter of the Sons of the American Revolution by virtue of his great-grandfather John Hale, a colonel in the New Hampshire Militia and a surgeon in the First New Hampshire Continental Line. Hale was the director of the Salt Lake Chamber of Commerce and served on the Board of Public Works.

Hale died in Salt Lake City on September 6, 1934.

== Notable works ==
Notable works by Hale include:

=== In Aspen ===
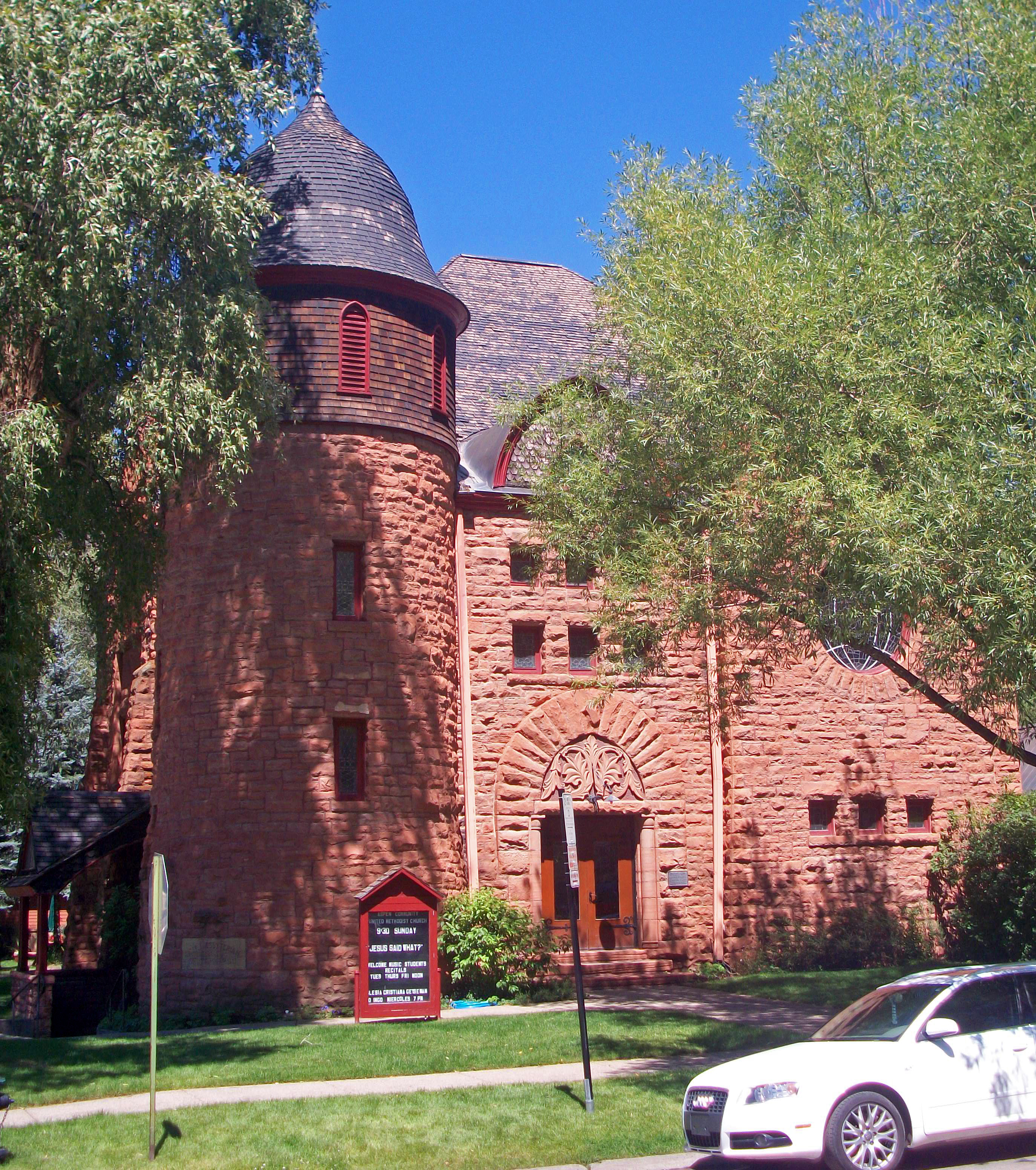
Aspen Community Church, Aspen, Colorado

- Aspen Community Church, NRHP-listed
- Cowenhoven Block
- Aspen Block

=== In Denver ===
- Curry-Chucovich House, NRHP-listed
- Trinity United Methodist Church (with Roeschlaub)

=== In Pueblo ===
- Nathaniel W. Duke House, NRHP-listed
- First Congregational Church, NRHP-listed
- Charles H. Stickney House, NRHP-listed

=== Elsewhere in Colorado ===
- Longmont College (1886), 546 Atwood St., Longmont, Colorado, NRHP-listed
- Woodbury Hall (1889), "the first building on the University of Colorado's campus to have electricity and hot and cold running water"

=== In Salt Lake City, Utah ===
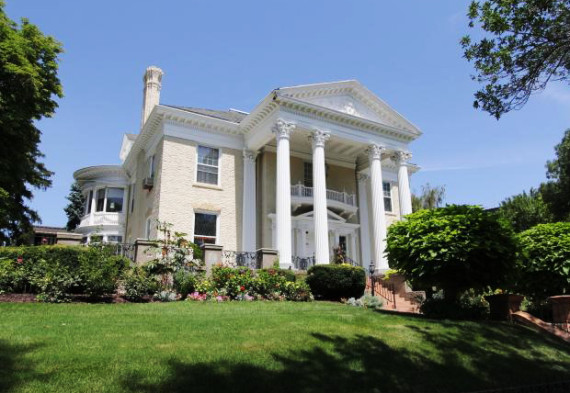
McIntyre House, 1898, National Register of Historic Places

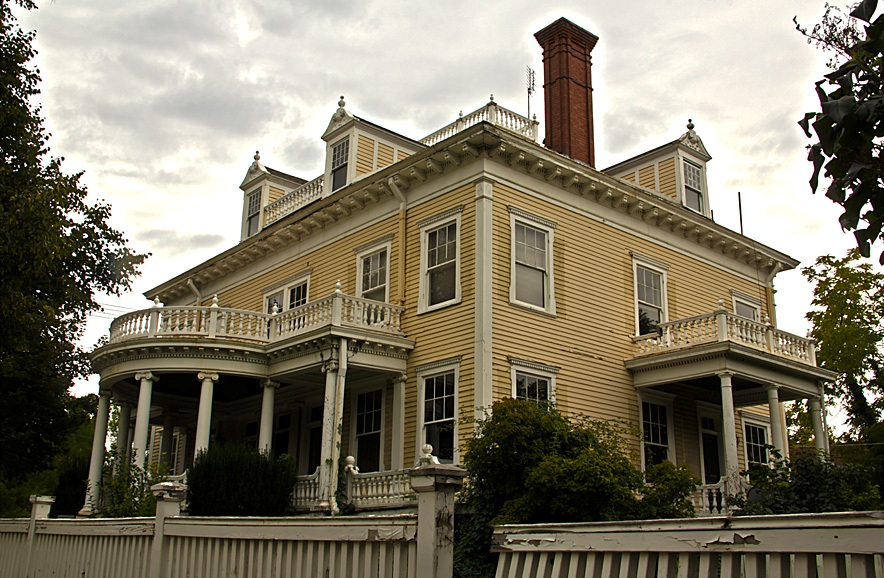
William A. Nelden House

- First Methodist Episcopal Church, NRHP-listed
- David Keith Mansion and Carriage House, NRHP-listed
- Keith-O'Brien Building, NRHP-listed
- McIntyre House, NRHP-listed
- William A. Nelden House, NRHP-listed, an early and "pure" example of Georgian style in Utah
- Old Hansen Planetarium, NRHP-listed

=== In Ely, Nevada ===
- Nevada Northern Railway East Ely Yards and Shops, NRHP-listed

=== In Laramie, Wyoming ===
- Old Main, University of Wyoming campus, NRHP-listed
