= Charles H. Stickney House =

Historic house in Colorado, United States

- U.S. National Register of Historic Places
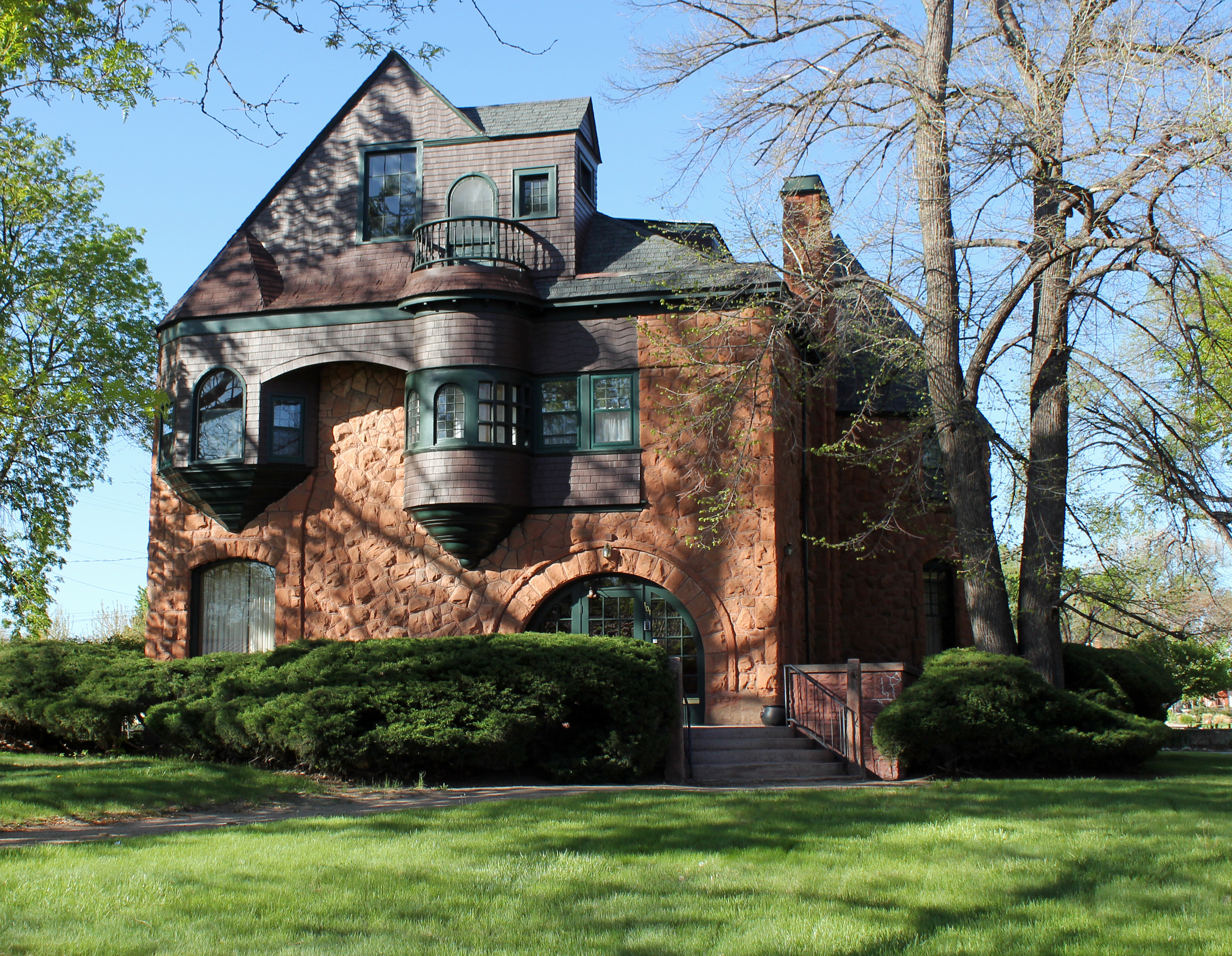

- Location within Colorado Location within the United States
- Location: 101 E. Orman Ave., Pueblo, Colorado
- Coordinates: 38°15′16″N 104°37′36″W
- Area: 0.4 acres (0.16 ha)
- Built: 1890
- Architect: William Halsey Wood; Hale, F. A.
- Architectural style: Norman
- NRHP reference No.: 85000232
- Added to NRHP: February 8, 1985

The Charles H. Stickney House in Pueblo, Colorado, USA, was built in 1890. It was designed by New York architect William Halsey Wood, and Pueblo architect Frederick Albert Hale supervised its construction.

It was listed on the National Register of Historic Places in 1985.

It was deemed significant "for its unusual Norman design uncommon in Pueblo, for its interesting use of materials, and for its association with Charles Stickney."

Features associated with Norman architecture are the two towers, the arched entrance, and its applied shingled detailing.

Charles H. Stickney (b. 1854) arrived in Colorado in 1880 and was a banker in Longmont. He sold his business there and moved to Pueblo in 1887. He joined Andrew McClelland in a business that year. He opened a new business, Charles H. Stickney Co. Investment Bankers, in 1892, which handled mortgage loans and bonds secured on Pueblo properties with corresponding bank First National Bank of Boston. In 1905 it added insurance and other services. He was active in the community, serving on the boards of the YWCA and the McLelland Library, and helping the First Congregational Church of South Pueblo build its church.

The Orman-Adams Mansion, across Colorado Avenue from the house, is also listed on the National Register.
