= Nathaniel W. Duke House =

- U.S. National Register of Historic Places
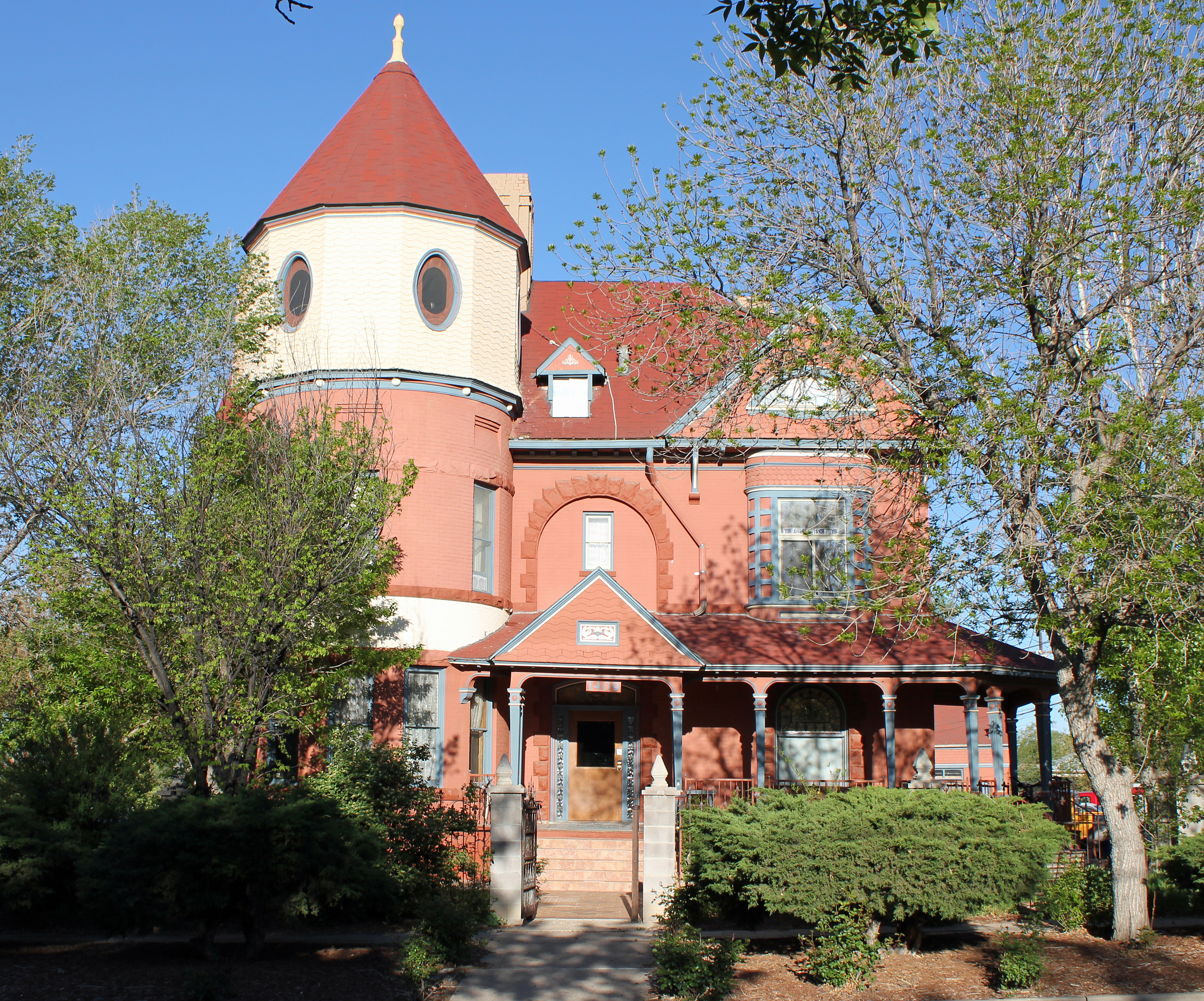
- House in 2012

- Location within Colorado
- Location: 1409 Craig St., Pueblo, Colorado
- Coordinates: 38.28013°N 104.61813°W
- Area: 0.3 acres (0.12 ha)
- Built: 1889
- Built by: Pierson & Kinetsen
- Architect: Fred A. Hale
- Architectural style: Queen Anne
- NRHP reference No.: 85000229
- Added to NRHP: February 8, 1985

The Nathaniel W. Duke House, at 1409 Craig St. in Pueblo, Colorado, was built in 1889. It was listed on the National Register of Historic Places in 1985.

== History ==
It was deemed significant as a good example of Queen Anne-style residential architecture, and for its association with pioneer-era businessman Nathaniel W. Duke (1846–1893).

The house was designed by Denver architect Fred A. Hale and is prominent as the largest house in the Craig subdivision. It was built by contractors Pierson and Rinetsen under supervision of Weston & Bicknell as Superintendent of Construction.

Duke moved to Pueblo in 1868 and joined the Thatcher Brothers in their general mercantile store. In 1879, Duke ran for county treasurer and remained in that office for two years. He then formed a partnership with William Orman in the Dexter Livery Stable. Fire destroyed the stable in July, 1875, and the firm was dissolved. In 1876, Duke entered into the grocery business with Charles Henkel as a junior partner with the firm known as the Charles Henkel and Company. As the business grew it evolved into a wholesale grocery operation. Together, Henkel and Duke built one of the most successful wholesale grocery businesses in southern Colorado, serving both Colorado and adjacent territories. The firm carried a stock of $200,000 and did an annual business of one quarter of a million dollars. Duke died on December 18, 1893. In his obituary he was eulogized as "one of the best known wholesale grocerymen in the country, his acquaintance being large throughout the East and West. As a businessman, he showed himself to be possessed of unusual judgement and sagacity. In his death, Pueblo loses one of her most highly respected and public spirited citizens" (Pueblo Daily Chieftain, December 18, 1893, p. 5). In a letter written by Charles Henkel to the Southern Colorado Pioneers Association on May 25, 1917, Mr, Henkel referred to Duke as "one of the most brilliant businessmen in the State of Colorado." Following his death, the Duke family continued in the business with Mr. Henkel. Ella, his wife, and son Thomas became officers, and the firm became known as the Henkel-Duke Mercantile Company.

Its tower provides fine views.

== See also ==
- National Register of Historic Places listings in Pueblo County, Colorado
