= McIntyre House (Salt Lake City) =

Historic house in Salt Lake City, Utah, U.S.

- U.S. National Register of Historic Places
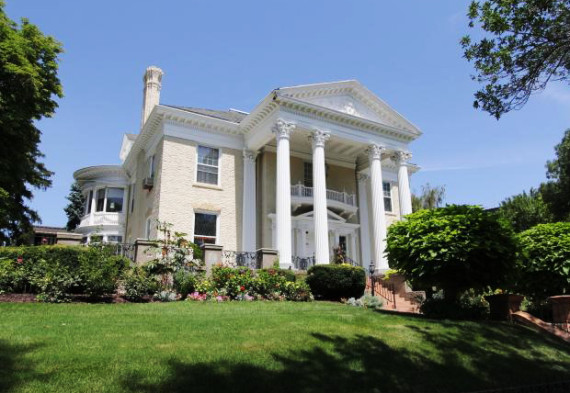

- Location within Utah Location within the United States
- Location: 259 E. 7th Ave., Salt Lake City, Utah, United States
- Coordinates: 40°46′39″N 111°52′54″W
- Area: less than one acre
- Built: 1898
- Architect: Hale, Frederick A.
- Architectural style: Greek Revival
- NRHP reference No.: 78002677
- Added to NRHP: July 17, 1978

The McIntyre House is a historic mansion built in 1898 and located at 259 E. 7th Ave. in Salt Lake City, Utah, United States. It was designed by architect Frederick Albert Hale. The home was listed by the National Park Service on the National Register of Historic Places in 1978.

According to its NRHP nomination, the house was commissioned by Gilbert S. "Gill" Peyton and first called "Peyton Hall."

Peyton, a Nebraska pharmacist who perfected and patented a cyanide-based method for extracting gold dust from mud, previously made his way to Utah where he and his partners purchased the largely abandoned Mercur Mine and became wealthy. The house was sold in 1901 to fellow mining executive William H. McIntyre who also founded the McIntyre Ranch, one of the largest working ranches in Canada. His descendants lived in "McIntyre House" until the property was purchased by the president of the LDS Church in 1963 for use by LDS Hospital and Brigham Young University College of Nursing and renamed "Colonial House."

Following fifty years of institutional usage, in 2013 the property returned to its previous name and private ownership when a family purchased and restored the residence.
