= Mercur, Utah =

Ghost town in Utah, United States

Coordinates: 40°19′15″N 112°12′44″W

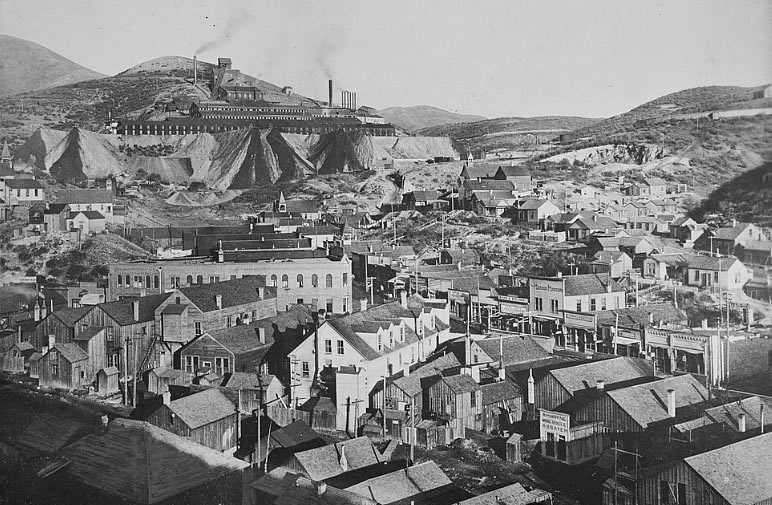
Mercur, Utah circa 1910. Mercur Mine in background.

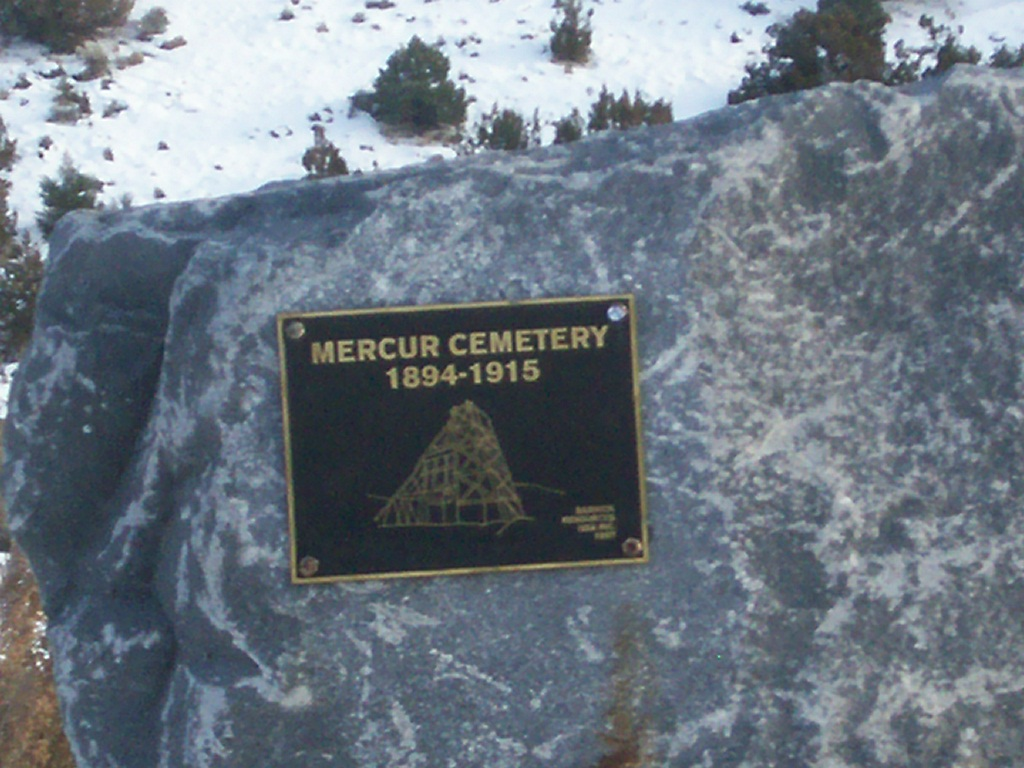
Plaque in front of the Mercur cemetery

Mercur is a historical hard rock mining ghost town in Tooele County, Utah, United States. In 1891, it became the site of the first successful use of the cyanide process of gold extraction in the United States, the dominant metallurgy today. Its elevation above sea level is approximately 2,042 m. The nearby Mercur Gold Mine was re-opened by Barrick Gold in 1985, with mining operations again coming to an end in 1997. The reclamation and restoration project was set to continue up to 2010.

== History ==
The town first came into being in 1870 as Lewiston (not to be confused with the present-day city of Lewiston in Cache County), when gold was discovered at the head of the Lewiston Canyon, six miles west of present-day Cedar Fort. A small gold rush began, peaking about 1873; the population reached as high as 2000. During the mid-1870s, silver boomed, and silver mines were opened and quartz mills to process the ore were built. A million dollars' worth of silver bullion was shipped down the valley, but the ore quickly gave out, and Lewiston became a ghost town by 1880.

In 1879, a Bavarian miner named Arie Pinedo had discovered a deposit of cinnabar in the area. The ore contained gold as well as mercury, but contemporary processes were unable to extract it. Similar discoveries were made throughout the 1880s.

In 1890, a group of Nebraska "farmers" bought the Mercur claim through an over optimistic promoter. They opened the mine and put in a basic amalgamation mill, a grand flop. Mercur ores were not workable with the ancient process. One of the Nebraska partners, Gilbert S. "Gill" Peyton, a former druggist, heard of the new but unperfected cyanide process and gave it a try. Fearful of losing his and his relatives investment, he solved the difficulties of the new method on the ores, and by December 1891 proved that the cyanide process worked – the first such successful operation in the United States. (The cyanide process has come to dominate western gold metallurgy.) As a result, Peyton and his brother-in-law, partner Hal Brown became rich, as did others of the Nebraska group, including company president John Dern, a Fremont, Nebraska grain dealer soon-to-be Salt Lake City business leader. (Brown's niece married Dern's son George, who became a manager of Mercur Con, a successful mining engineer, and Utah governor, 1925-1933; he then served as Secretary of War under Franklin Delano Roosevelt, 1933-1936).

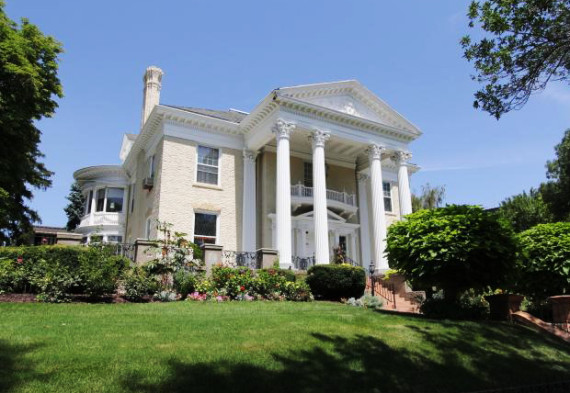
McIntyre Mansion (Peyton Hall), listed on the National Register of Historic Places

The advent of the cyanide process started the gold rush all over again. Gold was extracted not only from newly mined ore, but from old tailings as well. Soon, there were enough people to build a new town on the old site, but the name of Lewiston was already taken by then. The citizens settled on the name Mercur, from the Nebraska company's name, which in turn came from the name of Pinedo's claim. A branch railroad was built in the fall and winter of 1894. A dozen mining operations worked the area's ores with the largest being the Golden Gate Mining Company, which operated the largest cyanide mill in the U. S. in 1898-1902 (A young Daniel C. Jackling, of later Bingham Canyon fame, designed the structure which is visible in photos above the town). In 1902, Joseph DeLamar sold the Golden Gate operation to the Derns and partners, who formed the Mercur Consolidated. Gill Peyton and Hal Brown had sold out by then. Brown became a Utah banker and promoter of horse racing while Peyton began working mines across the country and in Mexico. He left Salt Lake City, where he sold his Greek revival mansion, Peyton Hall, now known as the McIntyre Mansion, and died in California in 1930, looking for a second Mercur mine bonanza.

Amongst the miners were many members of the Church of Jesus Christ of Latter-day Saints. There was, however, no organization of the church in Mercur until 1896 when a branch was organized with Charles B. Felt as president. In 1899, Moses W. Reynolds, James Duckworth and Sidney S. Reynolds were sent to the town as missionaries. Their success in both bringing church members out and possibly having some convert baptisms led to the organization of a ward in Mercur on July 1, 1900 with George W. Bryan as bishop.

In 1902, a fire that started in the business district of the town burned almost the entire city to the ground. The town was rebuilt and mining resumed again. In its heyday, there were about 5,000 residents of Mercur.

Mercur supported a large Italian immigrant community; young men were attracted by the opportunity of high wages and the romance of the American "wild west". With this Italian influence, Columbus Day became an important city event including parades, games and performances by the Mercur City Band.

The ward was discontinued in 1913 because the mines had closed and the majority of the population had moved away.

By 1916, there was only one building left in Mercur, and by 1930 it was gone.

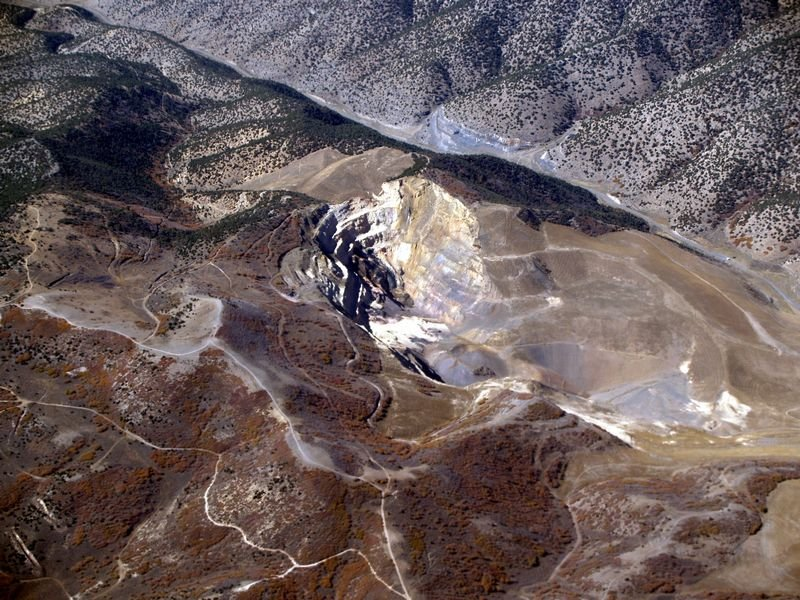
Aerial view of the Mercur open pit in 2007

== Mercur Gold Mine ==
The most recently producing Mercur Gold Mine went into production in 1985, and is operated by Barrick Mercur Gold Mines Foundation, a wholly owned subsidiary of Barrick Gold. Annual production was about $US 20 million.

Mercur is known for producing specimens of the rare thallium sulfosalt mineral lorándite, TlAsS_{2}. The mining operations again came to an end in 1997, with the processing mill continuing to run until late 1998

== See also ==
- List of ghost towns in Utah
