= Keith–O'Brien Building =

Historic building in Salt Lake City, Utah, U.S.

- U.S. National Register of Historic Places
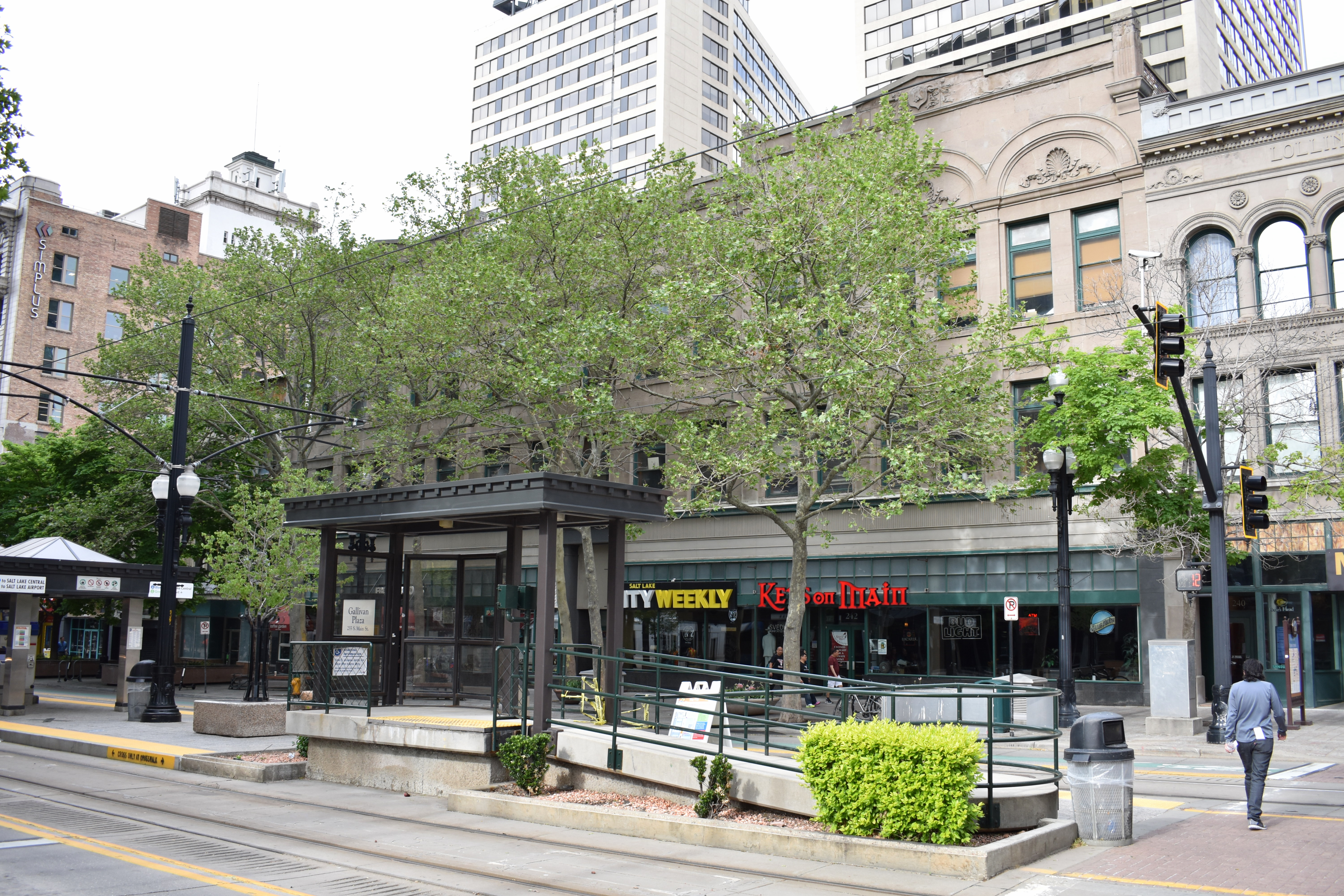
- The Keith–O'Brien Building, behind trees the City Center TRAX station, May 2019

- Location within Utah Location within the United States
- Location: 242-56 S. Main St., Salt Lake City, Utah
- Coordinates: 40°45′49″N 111°53′27″W
- Area: less than one acre
- Built: 1902
- Architect: Hale, Frederick Albert
- NRHP reference No.: 77001310
- Added to NRHP: August 16, 1977

The Keith–O'Brien Building (also known as the Keith Building) is a historic commercial building in downtown Salt Lake City, Utah, United States, that is listed on the National Register of Historic Places (NRHP).

== Description ==
The building, located at 242–256 South Main Street, is a department store building that was built in 1902. It was designed by architect Frederick Albert Hale and was built for $150,000 (equivalent to $5.58 million in 2025) .

According to its NRHP nomination, it is important in part as "an important monument to a leading Utah developer, businessman, statesman, and philanthropist, David Keith."

It was listed on the National Register of Historic Places in 1977.

== See also ==
- National Register of Historic Places listings in Salt Lake City
