= William A. Nelden House =

Historic house in Salt Lake City, Utah, U.S.

- U.S. National Register of Historic Places
- U.S. Historic district – Contributing property
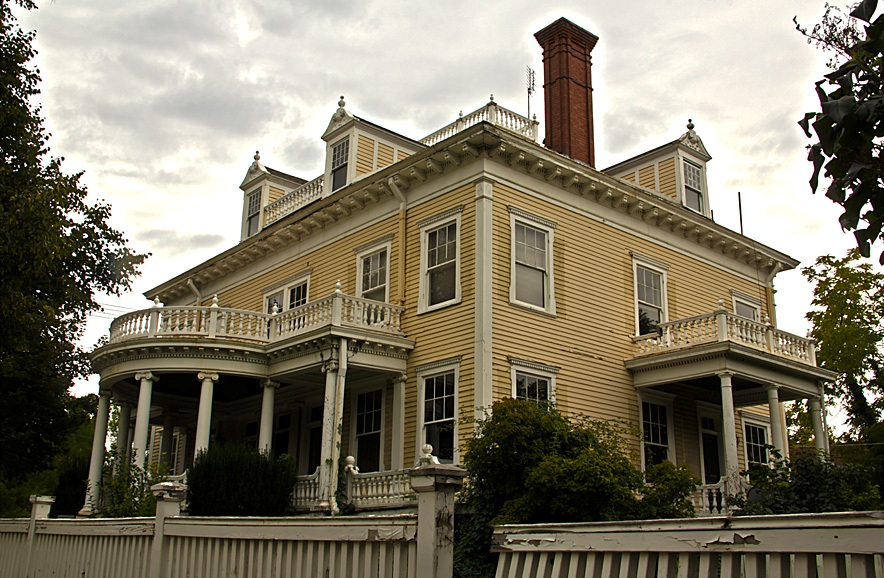
- William A. Nelden House, September 2012

- Location within Utah Location within the United States
- Location: 1172 East 100 South, Salt Lake City, Utah; United States
- Coordinates: 40°46′1″N 111°51′23″W
- Area: less than one acre
- Built: 1894
- Built by: Robinson Bros.
- Architect: Hale, Frederick A.
- Architectural style: Colonial Revival, Georgian Revival
- Part of: University Neighborhood Historic District (ID95001430)
- NRHP reference No.: 78002678

Significant dates
- Added to NRHP: October 19, 1978
- Designated CP: December 13, 1995

The William A. Nelden House is a historic house in northeastern Salt Lake City, Utah, that is located within the University Neighborhood Historic District, but is individually listed on the National Register of Historic Places (NRHP).

== Description ==
The house is located at 1172 East 100 South. Constructed in 1894 and designed by American architect Frederick Albert Hale, the two-story house "is one of Utah's earliest and purest examples of Georgian Revival architecture" according to its NRHP nomination. It was built at an approximate cost of $8,000.

It was listed on the NRHP on October 19, 1978.

== See also ==
- National Register of Historic Places listings in Salt Lake City
