= Cheyenne County Jail =

- U.S. National Register of Historic Places
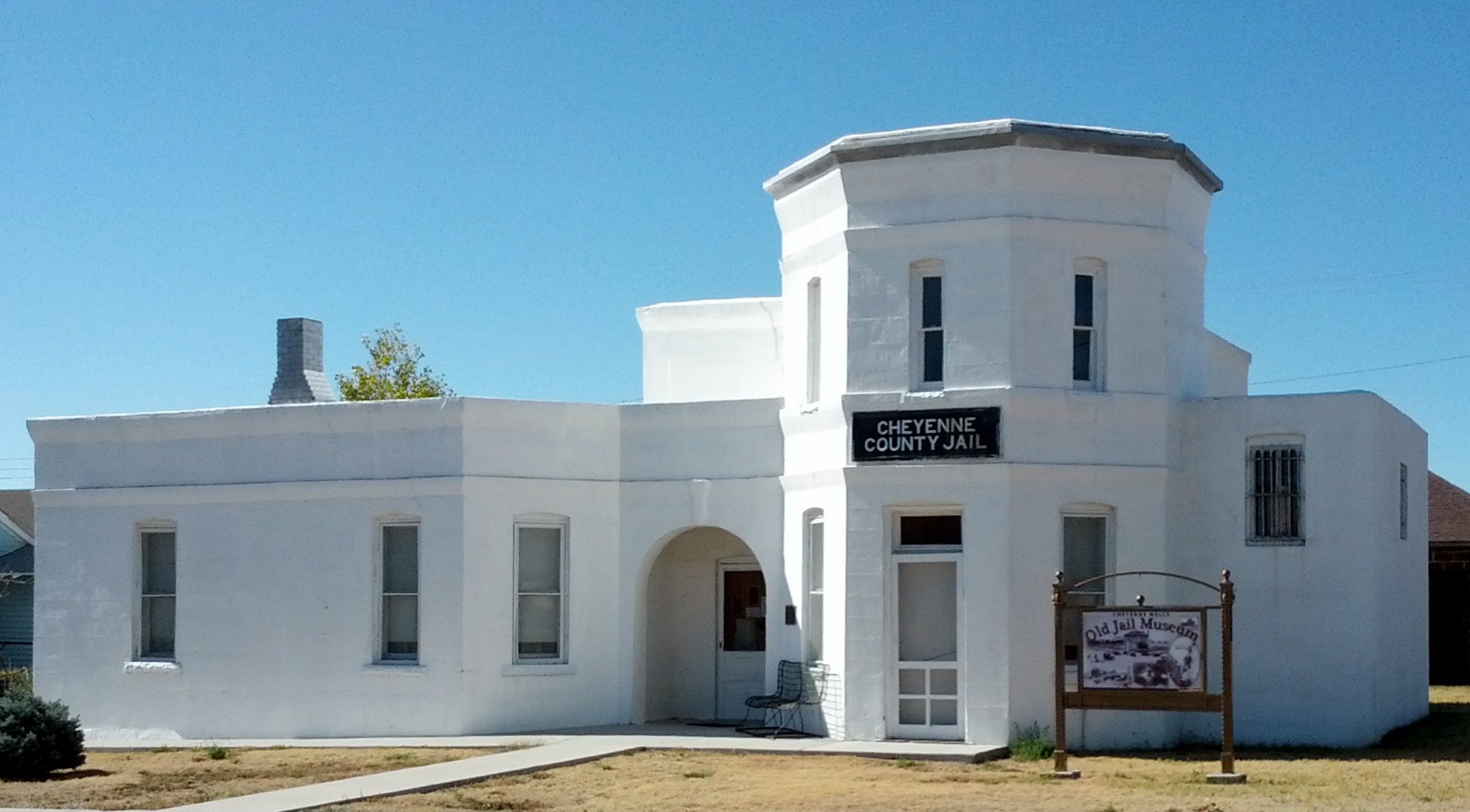

- Location within Colorado Location within the United States
- Location: 85 W. Second St., Cheyenne Wells, Colorado
- Coordinates: 38°49′14″N 102°21′3″W
- Area: less than one acre
- Built: 1894
- Built by: Frisk, W.J.
- Architect: Roeschlaub, Robert S.
- Architectural style: Romanesque
- NRHP reference No.: 88000758
- Added to NRHP: June 16, 1988

The Cheyenne County Jail, at 85 W. Second St. in Cheyenne Wells, Colorado, was built in 1894. It was a work of Denver architect Robert S. Roeschlaub with some Romanesque Revival styling. It is now operated as the Cheyenne Wells Old Jail Museum. It was listed on the National Register of Historic Places in 1988.

It was operated as a jail from 1894 through sometime after 1937, then eventually was closed. It became a museum in 1962 with the creation of the Eastern Colorado Historical Society, which operated until 1972 then was revived in 1976. It is open during the summer.
