= Longmont College =

Historic building in Longmont, Colorado

- U.S. National Register of Historic Places
- Colorado State Register of Historic Properties
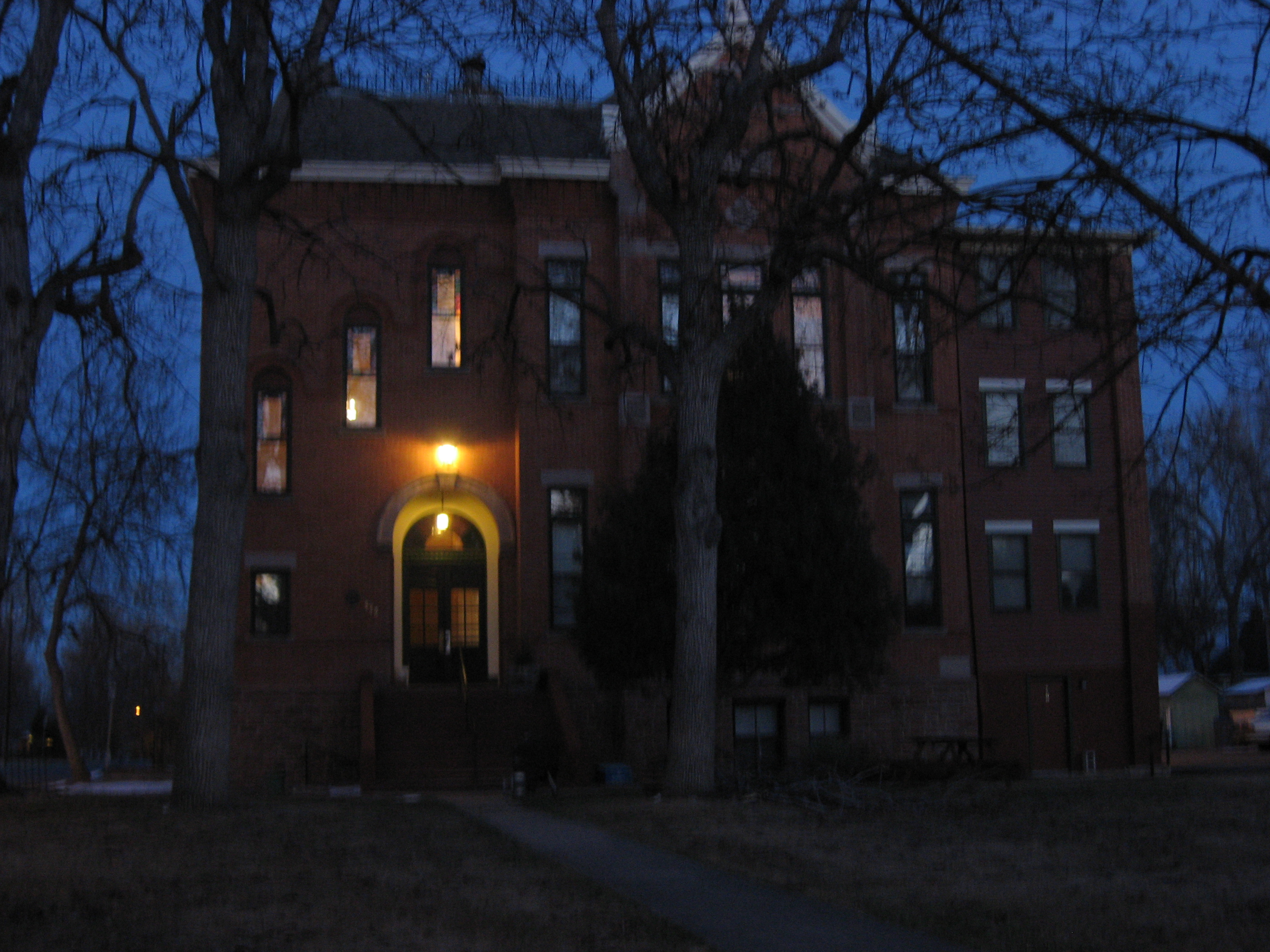

- Location within Colorado Location within the United States
- Location: 546 Atwood Street; Longmont, Colorado, United States
- Coordinates: 40°10′08″N 105°05′45″W
- Built: 1886
- Architect: Frederick Albert Hale
- Architectural style: Italianate
- NRHP reference No.: 87001285
- CSRHP No.: 5BL.1153

Significant dates
- Added to NRHP: August 12, 1987
- Designated CSRHP: August 12, 1987

Longmont College, also known as The Landmark, is a building in Longmont, Colorado that briefly housed the city's first college from 1886 to 1889. It was listed on the National Register of Historic Places in 1987.

The Presbyterian Synod of Colorado originally commissioned the design of a much larger building for the site to house what was to become Longmont Presbyterian College. The south wing was built in 1886: a two-story brick building in the Italianate style. Due to financial problems, this was the only wing completed, and the college closed after only three years, reopening as a preparatory school, Longmont Academy. The building later housed Longmont High School and a series of Catholic schools before being sold and subdivided into apartments during the post-World War II housing shortage.
