= Trinity United Methodist Church (Denver) =

Historic church in Colorado, United States

- U.S. National Register of Historic Places
- Colorado State Register of Historic Properties
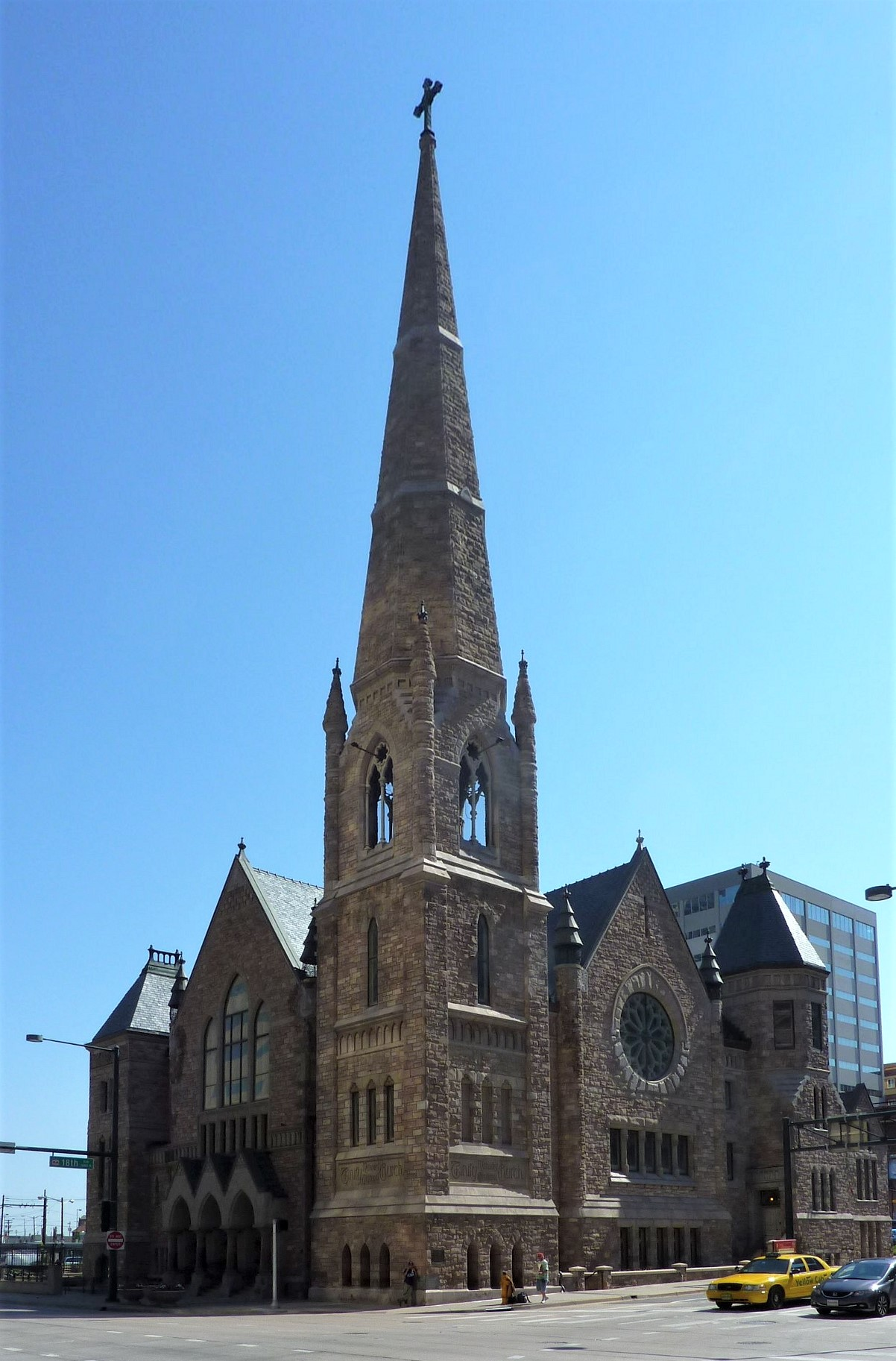

- Location within Colorado Location within the United States
- Location: E. 18th Ave. and Broadway, Denver, Colorado
- Coordinates: 39°44′43″N 104°59′11″W
- Area: 9.9 acres (4.0 ha)
- Built: 1887
- Architect: Roeschlaub, Robert S.
- Architectural style: Gothic
- NRHP reference No.: 70000161
- CSRHP No.: 5DV.115
- Added to NRHP: July 28, 1970

Trinity United Methodist Church (Trinity Methodist Episcopal Church) is a historic church at E. 18th Ave. and Broadway in Denver, Colorado.

It was built in 1887 and was added to the National Register in 1970. The main auditorium can seat 1200 people. At the time of its construction it was the largest venue in Denver. The spire is 181 feet tall. It houses a 4290 pipe organ built in the Roosevelt style. It is also home to several stained glass windows. The building was extended in 1926 using a similar architectural style.

Frederick Albert Hale (1855–1934) assisted architect Robert S. Roeschlaub (1843–1923) in its design.
