= David Keith Mansion and Carriage House =

Historic building in Salt Lake City, Utah, U.S.

- Keith, David, Mansion and Carriage House
- U.S. National Register of Historic Places
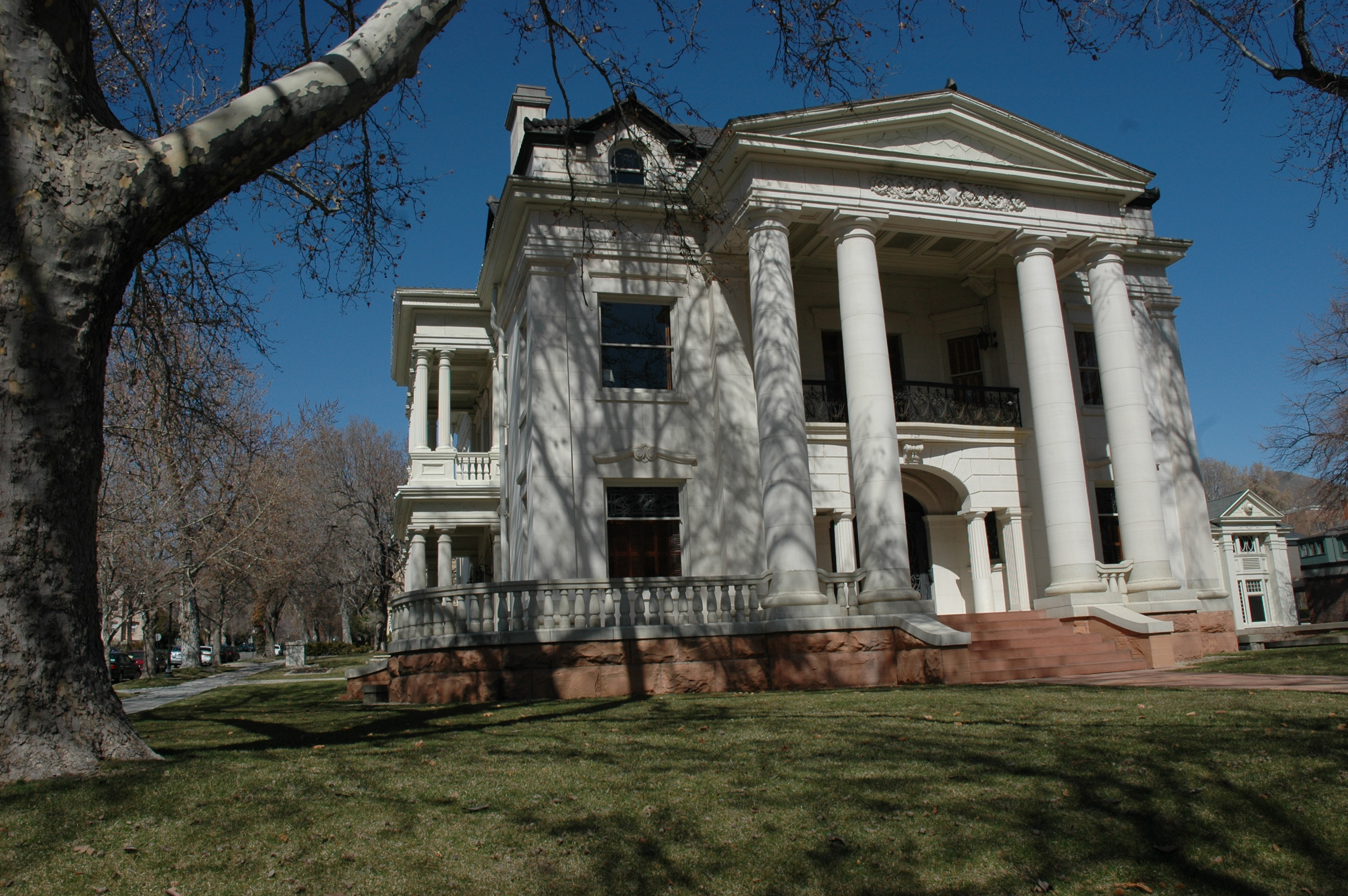
- The mansion in March 2010

- Location within Utah Location within the United States
- Location: 529 East South Temple Street; Salt Lake City, Utah; United States
- Coordinates: 40°46′11″N 111°52′30″W
- Area: less than one acre
- Built: 1898-1900
- Architect: Hale, Frederick Albert
- Architectural style: Late 19th and 20th Century Revivals, Renaissance Revival
- NRHP reference No.: 71000849
- Added to NRHP: May 14, 1971

The David Keith Mansion and Carriage House, at 529 East South Temple Street in Salt Lake City, Utah, United States, was built during 1898–1900. It was designed by architect Frederick Albert Hale. Keith lived in the home until 1916 when it was sold, and died in 1918. Among other activities, Keith financed and published The Salt Lake Tribune.

The property was listed on the National Register of Historic Places in 1971.

== See also ==
- National Register of Historic Places listings in Salt Lake City
