= First Methodist Episcopal Church (Salt Lake City) =

Historic church in Salt Lake City, Utah, U.S.

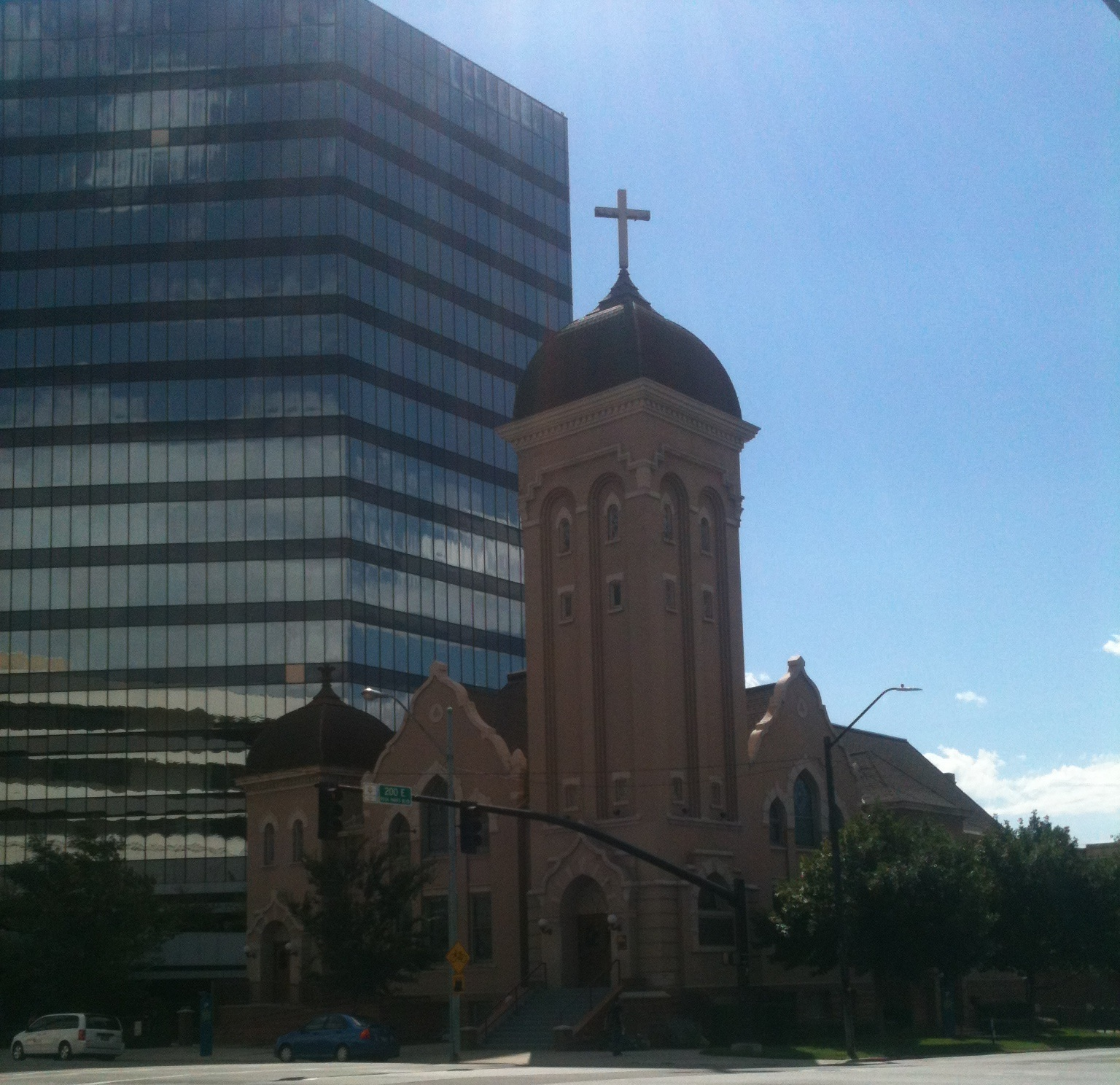
- First United Methodist Church First Methodist Episcopal Church Salt Lake City Utah
- U.S. National Register of Historic Places
- Location within Utah Location within the United States
- Location: 203 S. 200 East, Salt Lake City, Utah
- Coordinates: 40°46′24″N 111°54′29″W
- Area: less than one acre
- Built: 1905
- Architect: Frederick Albert Hale
- Architectural style: Victorian Eclectic
- NRHP reference No.: 94001582
- Added to NRHP: January 24, 1995

First United Methodist Church (historically known as First Methodist Episcopal Church) is a historic church at 203 S. 200 East in Salt Lake City, Utah, United States.

It was designed by architect Frederick Albert Hale and was built in 1905. Hale designed dozens of Salt Lake City buildings and a number of churches outside the state, but this was his only church in Utah.

It was added to the National Register of Historic Places in 1995.
