= Old Main (University of Wyoming) =

- U.S. National Register of Historic Places
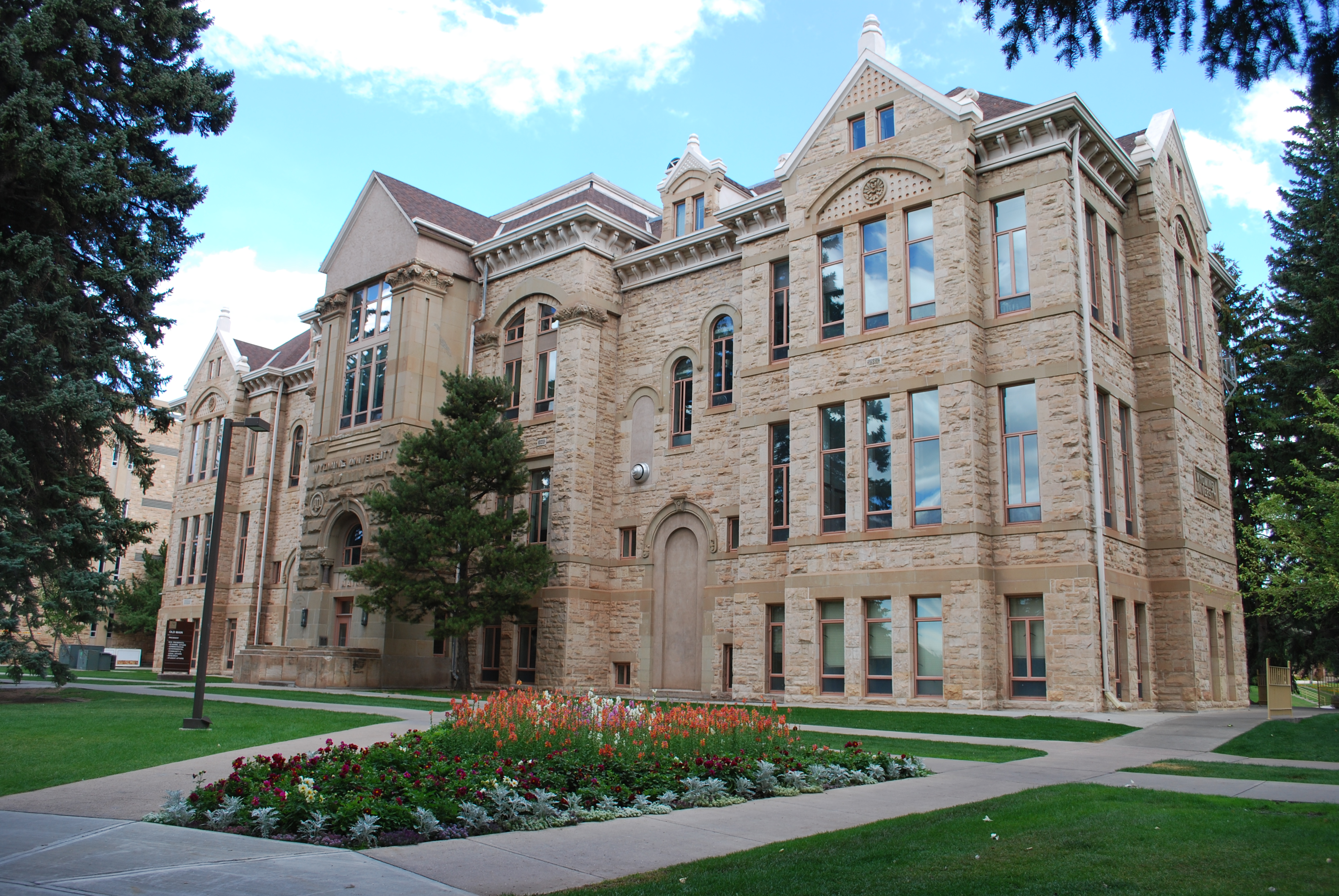
- View from southwest of Old Main in 2012

- Location within the United States Location within Wyoming
- Location: Ninth St. and Ivinson Ave., University of Wyoming; Laramie, Wyoming
- Coordinates: 41°18′44″N 105°35′2″W
- Built: 1886; 140 years ago
- Built by: Cook & Callahan
- Architect: Frederick Albert Hale
- Architectural style: Romanesque Revival
- NRHP reference No.: 86001536
- Added to NRHP: July 11, 1986

Old Main, built 140 years ago in 1886 in Laramie, Wyoming, was the first building on the University of Wyoming campus and continues as its oldest. At an approximate elevation of 7,180 feet (2,190 m) above sea level, it currently houses university administration.

== History ==
Old Main was built as a result of the University Bill, passed by the government of the Territory of Wyoming. In a compromise among territorial legislators, Laramie was given the university, Cheyenne was given the capitol, and Evanston was given $10,000 to build an insane asylum. All three were fast-growing cities near Wyoming's southern border and connected by the Union Pacific Railroad.

Territorial Governor Francis E. Warren appointed three Laramie residents to a building commission (J.W. Donnellan, LeRoy Grant and Robert Marsh) and allocated $50,000 to build the first university building in the territory. The building commission contracted Frederick Hale to design and Cook and Callahan to construct the building.

== Architecture and construction ==
Frederick Hale began his career as an architect in Denver around 1890. After designing Old Main early in his career, Hale moved to Utah and became an important figure in Salt Lake City architecture. Hale designed the David Keith Mansion, the Downey House, the Haxton Place, and the Markland/Walker House, all built on Salt Lake City's historic Temple Street. He also built the A.O. Whitmore Electric Automobile Building in Salt Lake City.

Hale designed Old Main in the Romanesque Revival style. Its heavy stone construction, axial nature, symmetry, arch, and rectangular footprint all reflect the Romanesque style. Rough-cut sandstone, quarried from east of Laramie, is the primary stone used. The trim stone is Potsdam Sandstone, quarried from the Rawlins area. This smooth-textured stone contrasts with the native sandstone.

As the first university building in the Wyoming Territory, Hale designed Old Main as an imposing structure. He included a central spire to serve both as a focal point for the structure and a signal of the building's importance. Old Main was built to reflect Wyoming rather than copying university structures of the Eastern United States. One can see the rough-textured body of the building representing the developing frontier, while the minimal usage of classical decoration might symbolize the emerging sophistication of the Wyoming population.

The Masonic Order laid the cornerstone on September 27, 1886, construction finished on September 1, 1887. Classes began five days later, on September 6, 1887. It was originally called the University Building, because it housed the entire university. It included classrooms, labs, administration, maintenance, an auditorium, and a library. A two-story, 500-seat auditorium on the second level quickly became an entertainment center for Laramie.

== Later changes ==
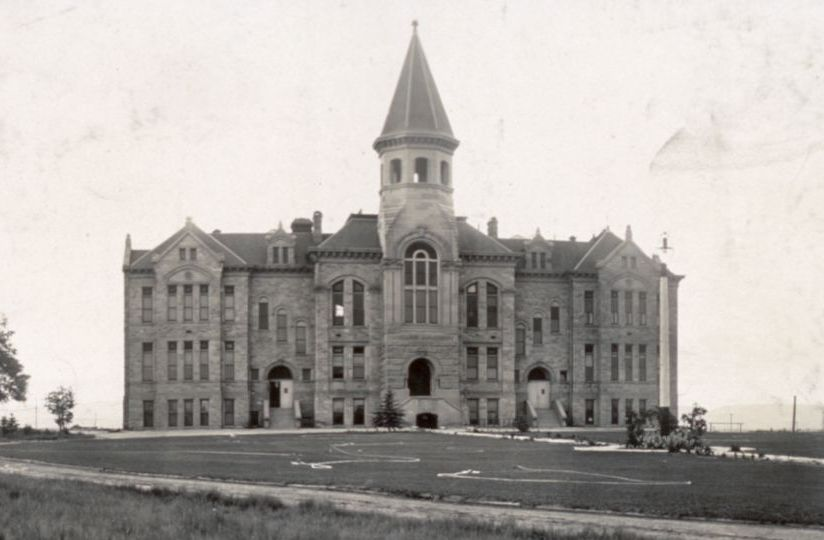
Old Main in 1908

The central spire was removed in 1916 due to structural concerns, completely changing the character of the structure. This alteration resulted in a somewhat awkward central section, which is now hidden by two large spruce trees. After the campus expanded, the building was renamed the Language Building.

The auditorium was reduced in size during a 1936 renovation and completely removed in 1949. This remodeling drastically changed the building's interior and did not match the original style. The auditorium was replaced by a large central staircase and two stories of office space still in use today. The 1949 remodeling also officially changed the buildings name to Old Main. The office of the president was remodeled at this time and remains much unchanged today.

Originally the entrances to Old Main were elevated above ground level, so that visitors would ascend to the first floor before entering the building. They were modified in 1949 so that visitors now enter down to the basement level. An elevator was added to the building in 2002.

== Context ==
Two Wyoming structures contemporary to Old Main are the Union Pacific Train Depot (1886) and State Capitol building (begun in 1887), both in Cheyenne. At the time of construction, Old Main would have had a similar level of importance to the Wyoming Territory as the other two structures. Together, these three structures show that the 1880s were a time of excitement, growth, and change in Wyoming. Shortly after the construction of Old Main, the state of Wyoming joined the United States in 1890.

== Influence ==
Old Main had a significant impact on the direction of architecture on the University of Wyoming's campus. This influence on later campus construction is visible through the similar use of native stone on most buildings and the similar three portal design used on structures such as Half Acre Gymnasium. University building construction today uses modern techniques and materials, such as steel, but still incorporate a rough-cut sandstone façade, resulting in a uniform architectural style throughout the campus.
