= Façade of the University of Valladolid =

Historic building facade in Valladolid, Spain

Coordinates: 41°39′09″N 4°43′18″W

Façade of the University of Valladolid (1716-1718).

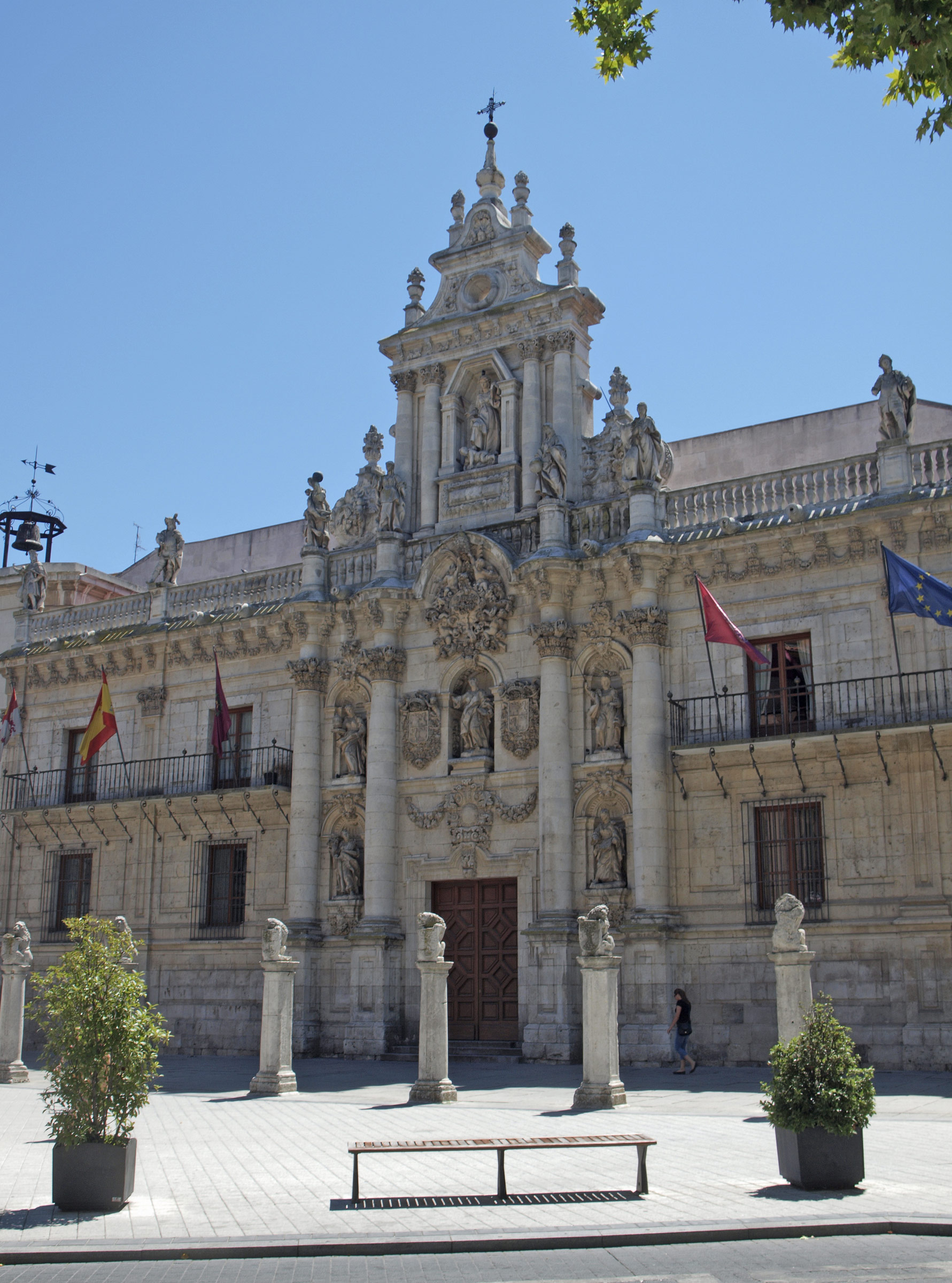
Main view of the façade.

The façade of the University of Valladolid of Spain was built between 1716 and 1718 in the Baroque style. The architect Fray Pedro de la Visitacion supervised the construction. The façade was part of a project to enlarge the buildings of the university.

On the façade are sculptural groups of allegoric representations of the subjects taught in the building. The central area has four gigantic columns, and at the top a comb. On the balustrade are represented the Spanish kings that contributed to the improvement of the university.

== History ==
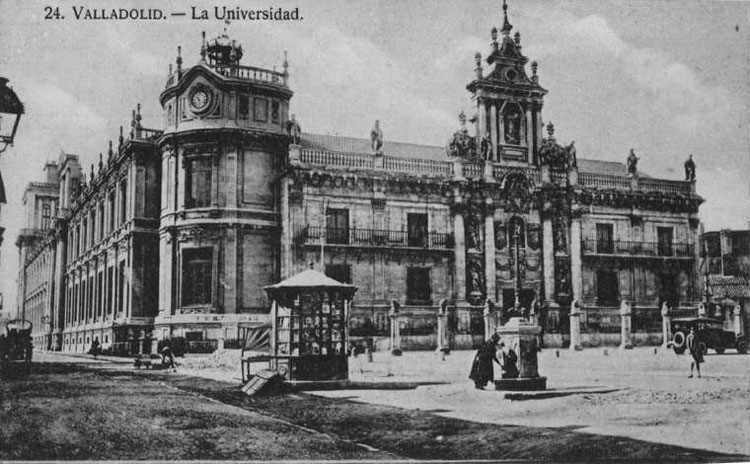
Old picture of the university.

The first building of the university was built in the 15th century. At the beginning of the 18th century, the old building was not sufficient because the university had grown, and an expansion of the complex was made. Another cloister was added that gave more rooms.

The complex composed by the two cloisters stayed until 1909 when it was destroyed to rebuild the university. The façade was kept with the new building. In April 1936 a fire destroyed the building, and during repairs stairs were added that go from the façade to the new building. The university is on the outskirts of town, however this building remains as part of the law department.

== Description of the façade ==
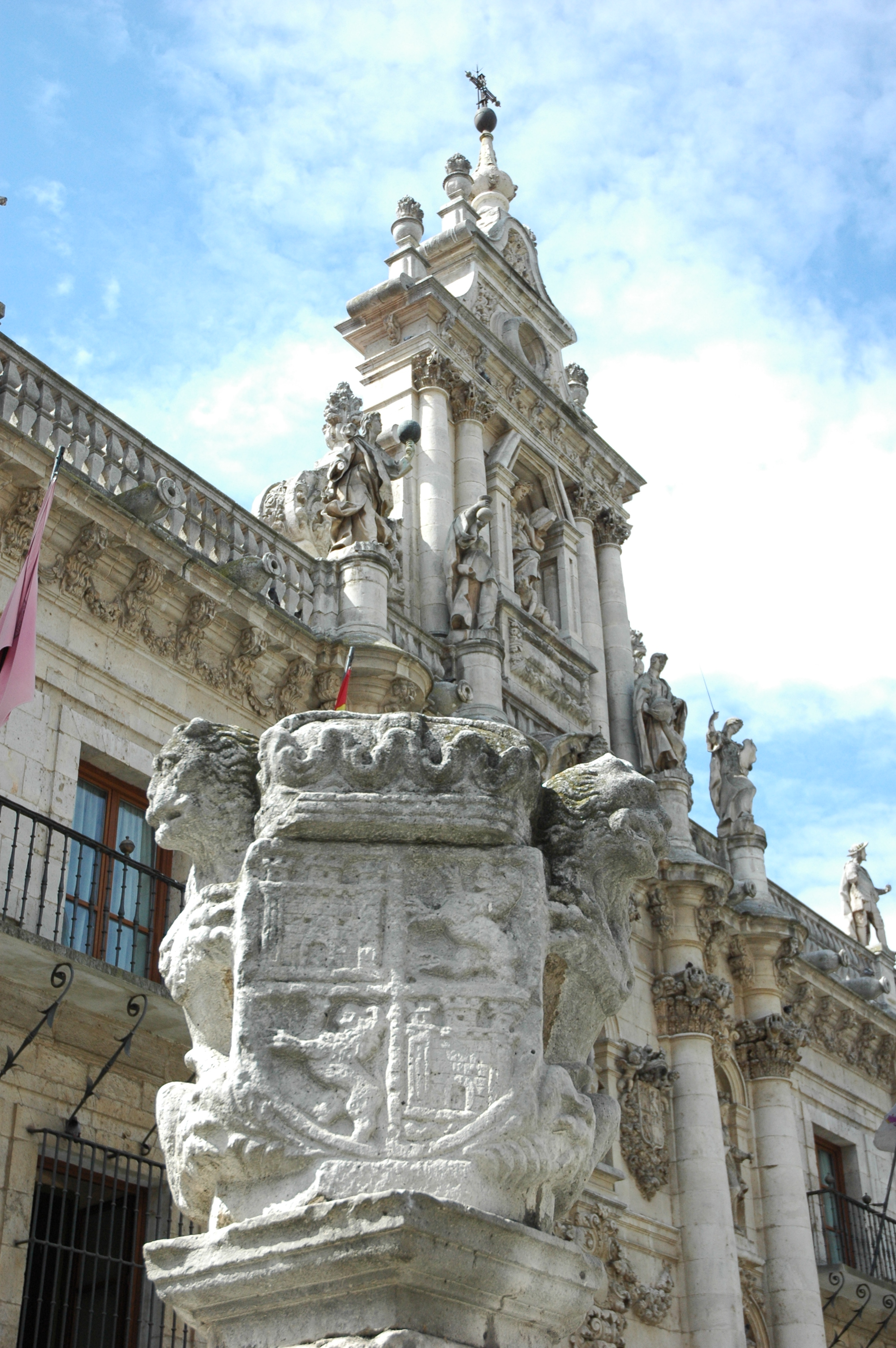
Details on the façade.

This façade is probably the most important baroque public building of Valladolid. It is made of stone brought from Campaspero and it is composed of two stories and gigantic columns, Corinthian capitals that produce the bow of the entablature. At the top, in the frontispiece, is the statue of the Wisdom, depicted as a matron walking over ignorance.

The comb ends the façade giving the sensation of movement. This effect of flexibility was achieve by the bulky size of the ornamentation sculpted in the stone. Those sculptures are composed by royal shields, allegorical figures representing the subjects given by the university (Rhetoric, Geometry, Theology, Canonic Science, Legal Science and Wisdom) and the sculptures of the Spanish kings who have contributed to the development of the Institution of Valladolid, which were Alfonso VIII, Juan I, Enrique III and Felipe II. The sculptures of the kings are located over the entablature and the balustrade, "protecting" the building. Most of the stone crafting was produced by the family Tomé.

The atrium is delineated by eighteen columns, each topped by lions holding the royal shield.

== Baroque characteristics ==
Baroque architecture is characterized as "dynamic and dramatic style". The comb located at the top of the building creates this dynamic style and a movement sensation. Another aspect of the façade is "the exaggerated gestures, excessive ornamentation, and unconcealed emotionalism" with the numerous sculptures. The supports have, mainly, a decorative purpose; the four gigantic columns are part of this excessive ornamentation and exaggerated gestures. This façade has an important role within the building.

The simplicity in the structure and in the floors shows that this piece of art is part of the early part of the Baroque movement influence by the post-herrerian architecture. However, the other elements make clear this building is from Baroque period.

== Bibliography ==
- Michael Fazio, Marian Moffet, Lawrence Wodehouse, Buildings across Time (London, 2008) Page 339
- Jesus Urrea, Guia Artistica de Valladolid, (Valladolid, 1990) Page 135
