= First Congregational Church (Pueblo, Colorado) =

Historic church in Colorado, United States

- U.S. National Register of Historic Places
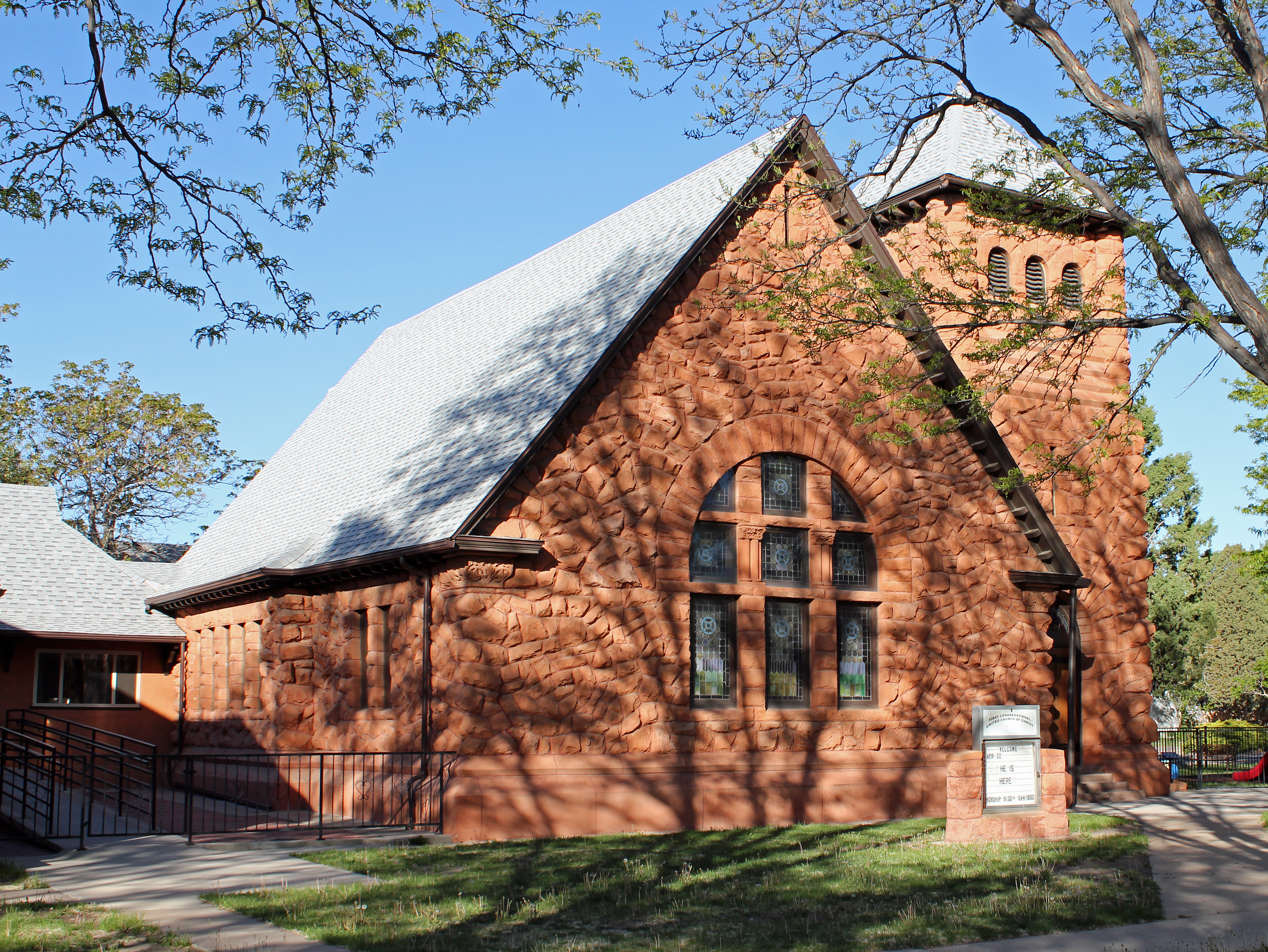

- Location within Colorado Location within the United States
- Location: 225 W. Evans, Pueblo, Colorado
- Coordinates: 38°15′37″N 104°37′57″W
- Area: 0.4 acres (0.16 ha)
- Built: 1889
- Built by: Piper Bros.
- Architect: Hale, Fred A.
- Architectural style: Romanesque
- NRHP reference No.: 85000230
- Added to NRHP: February 8, 1985

The First Congregational Church in Pueblo, Colorado is a Romanesque Revival style church building constructed in 1889. The building designed by Fred A. Hale and constructed in 1889 with Manitou sandstone includes a bell tower. It was added to the National Register of Historic Places in 1985.
