= Robert S. Roeschlaub =

American architect

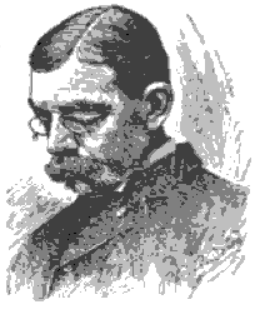
- Born: Robert Sawers Roeschlaub; July 6, 1843; Munich, Germany
- Died: October 25, 1923 (aged 80); San Diego, California
- Resting place: Fairmount Cemetery
- Occupation: Architect
- Spouse: Annie Mary Fisher (m. 1868)
- Children: 7

Robert Sawers Roeschlaub (July 6, 1843 – October 25, 1923) was a noted Colorado architect.

== Biography ==
Roeschlaub was born in Munich, Kingdom of Bavaria to Michael, private physician to the King of Bavaria, and Margaretta, his Scotland-born mother. The family emigrated to the United States in 1845, living in Missouri at first, but settling in Quincy, Illinois.

In August 1862, Robert enlisted from Quincy in the 84th Illinois Infantry - Company E as a sergeant, was promoted to second lieutenant in May 1863, promoted again to first lieutenant in March 1865, and promoted to captain on June 6, 1865 but never mustered with that rank as two days later he mustered out with the rank of first lieutenant. He was wounded twice during the Civil War, first in 1862 during the Battle of Stones River and later in 1863 at the Battle of Chickamauga.

After the war he returned to Quincy, marrying Annie Mary Fisher on September 29, 1868. They had seven children. He began studying architecture under Robert Bunce, relocating to Denver, Colorado in 1873 and practicing as Robert S. Roeschlaub. In 1903, his son Frank S. Roeschlaub joined the practice and the firm was renamed Roeschlaub & Son, which continued until Robert's retirement in 1912. He designed numerous schools, college buildings, churches and residences and commercial buildings. He was one of three curators at the Colorado Historical Society and worked on improving Denver's building code.

He was elected to the American Institute of Architects in 1889 and the College of Fellows of the AIA elevated Roeschlaub to Fellow in 1900. He was President of AIA Colorado from 1892 to 1912. In 1909 when the architect's licensing law was passed, Roeschlaub was given license Number One.

Denver commercial buildings he is credited with designing include the King Block (1879), Bancroft Block (1880), Times Building (1881), Union Block (1881), Barth Block (1881), A.T. Lewis & Son Dept. Store (1894;1902) and the I.F. Williams Store (1902). Only the Lewis Department Store and the Hover Drug Co. Buildings remain. The Lewis Department Store, though listed in the National Register, is considered significant for its historic rather than architectural association. The Hover is the best surviving example of a commercial structure designed by Roeschlaub.

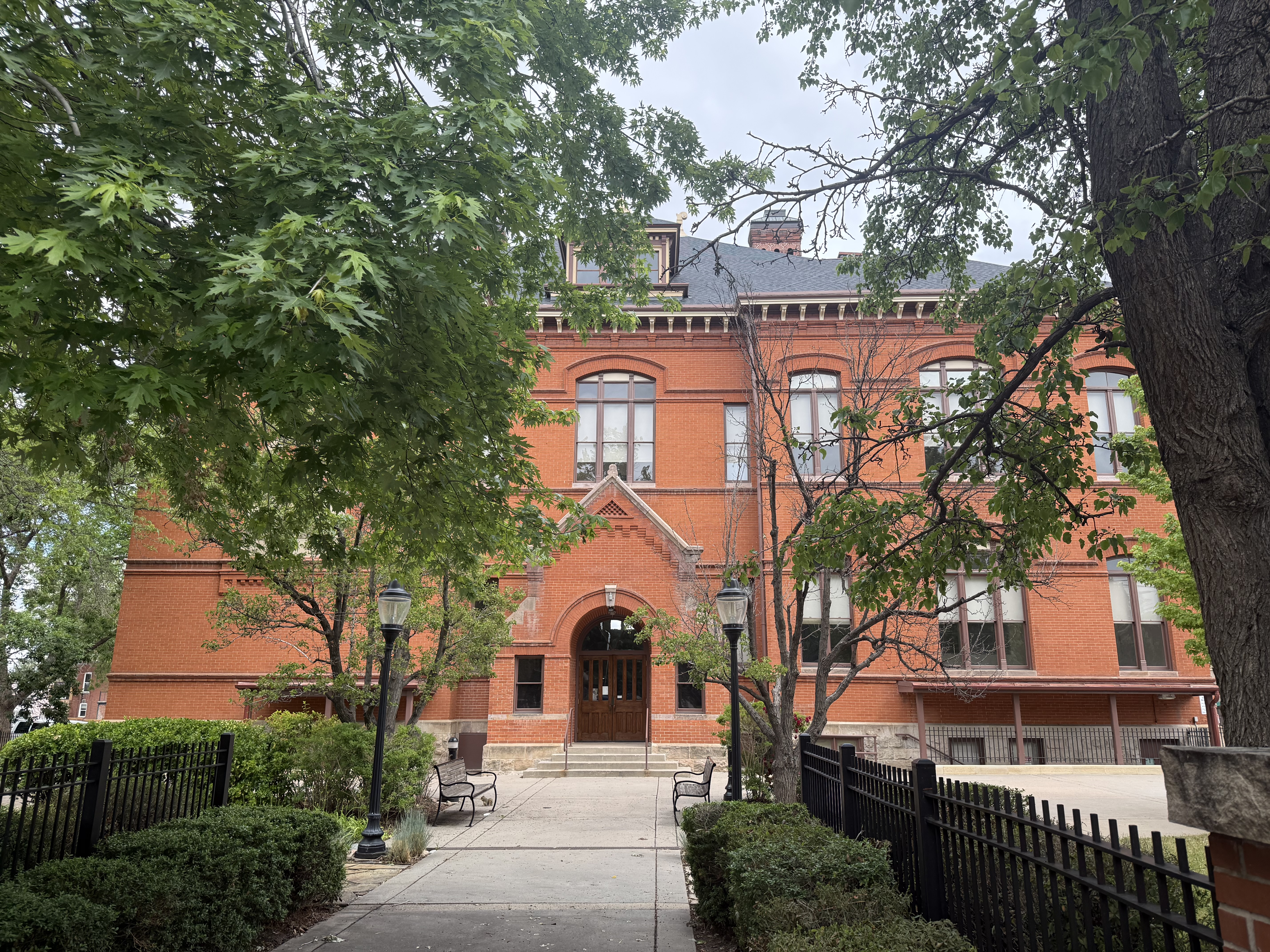
Emerson School, Denver, CO Architect Robert Roeschluab, 1885

Other National Register-listed Roeschlaub buildings include the Central City Opera House (1878), Emerson School (1885), Trinity United Methodist Church (1888), Corona School (1889), Chamberlin Observatory (1890) at the University of Denver, Cheyenne County Jail (1894) now a museum, the Hover Mansion (Longmont) (1902) and the First Congregational Church (Manitou Springs) (1882).

He was the subject of the book Robert S. Roeschlaub: Architect of the Emerging West, 1843-1923 by Francine Haber, Kenneth R. Fuller, and David N. Wetzel, originally published in April 1988 by the Colorado Historical Society and republished by the University Press of Colorado in July 1992.

Robert Sawers Roeschlaub died at San Diego, California on October 25, 1923. He is interred at Fairmount Cemetery, Denver.
