= Building at 561 West 200 South =

Historic building in Salt Lake City, Utah, U.S.

- Building at 561 W. 200 South
- U.S. National Register of Historic Places
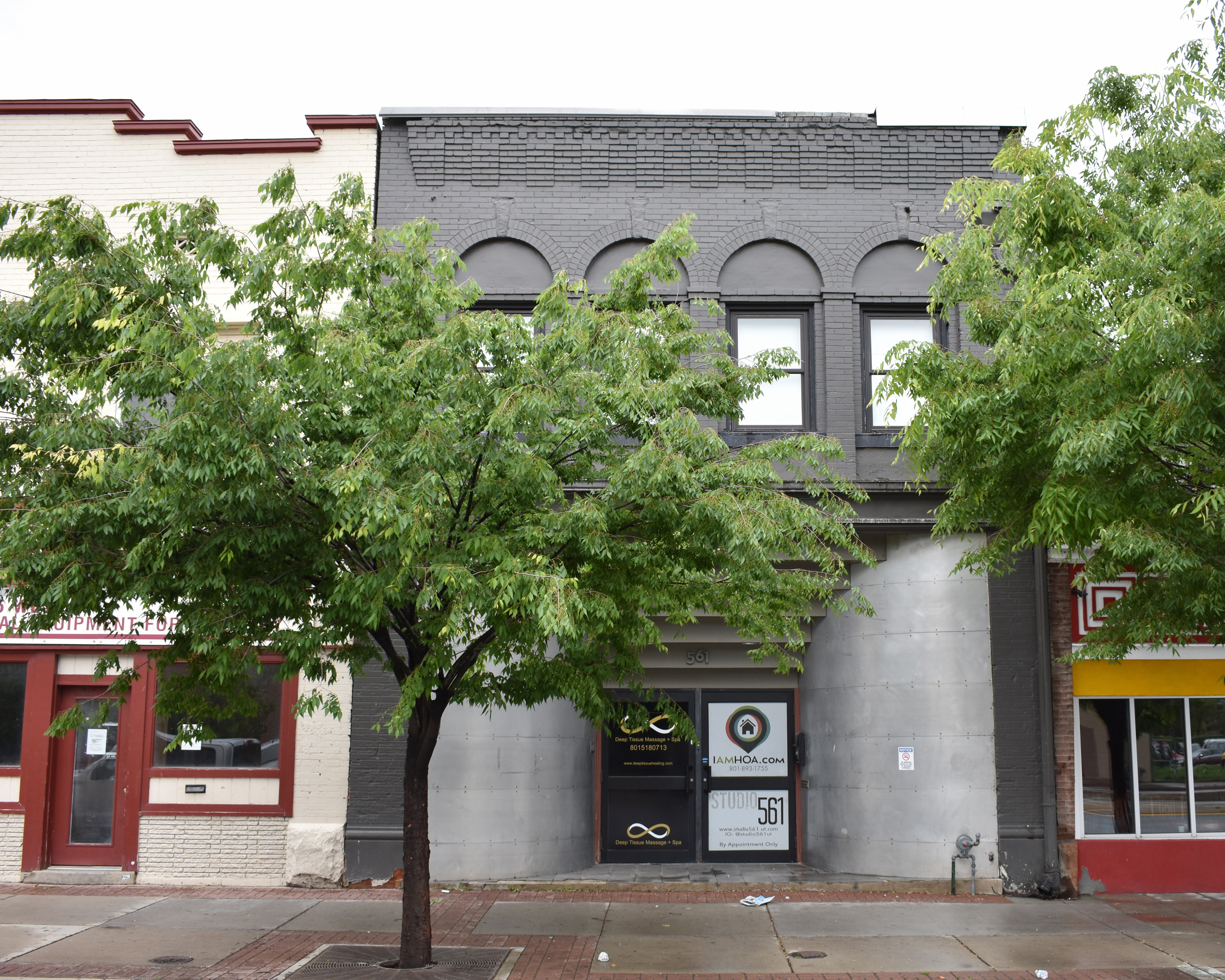
- The Building at 561 W 200 South in 2019

- Location within Utah Location within the United States
- Location: 561 W. 200 South, Salt Lake City, Utah
- Coordinates: 40°45′54″N 111°54′24″W
- Area: less than one acre
- Built: 1910
- MPS: Salt Lake City Business District MRA
- NRHP reference No.: 82004848
- Added to NRHP: December 27, 1982

The Building at 561 West 200 South in Salt Lake City, Utah, is a 2-story brick commercial building constructed about 1910 in the city's ethnic Greek neighborhood. Four second floor windows are separated by brick pilasters below a wide, denticulated cornice. The windows form an arcade with a recessed, segmented horizontal course of brick at the springer level and with arches bisected by prominent, narrow keystones. The Building at 561 West 200 South was added to the National Register of Historic Places in 1982.

The Building at 561 West 200 South was constructed for real estate speculator John J. Corum, and it contained a boarding house and saloon, both operated by Peter Fotis. In 1914 Anast Koulis ran a coffeehouse and saloon at the site, and Frank Manos owned the boardinghouse. Peter Zaharias operated a barbershop in the building at the time. In the late 1920s the building functioned as a warehouse; it then became home to Alder Sales Corporation, and then home to Fishler Furniture and Hardware Company.

== See also ==
- Building at Rear, 537 West 200 South
