= Building at Rear, 537 West 200 South =

Historic building in Salt Lake City, Utah, U.S.

- Building at Rear, 537 W. 200 South
- U.S. National Register of Historic Places
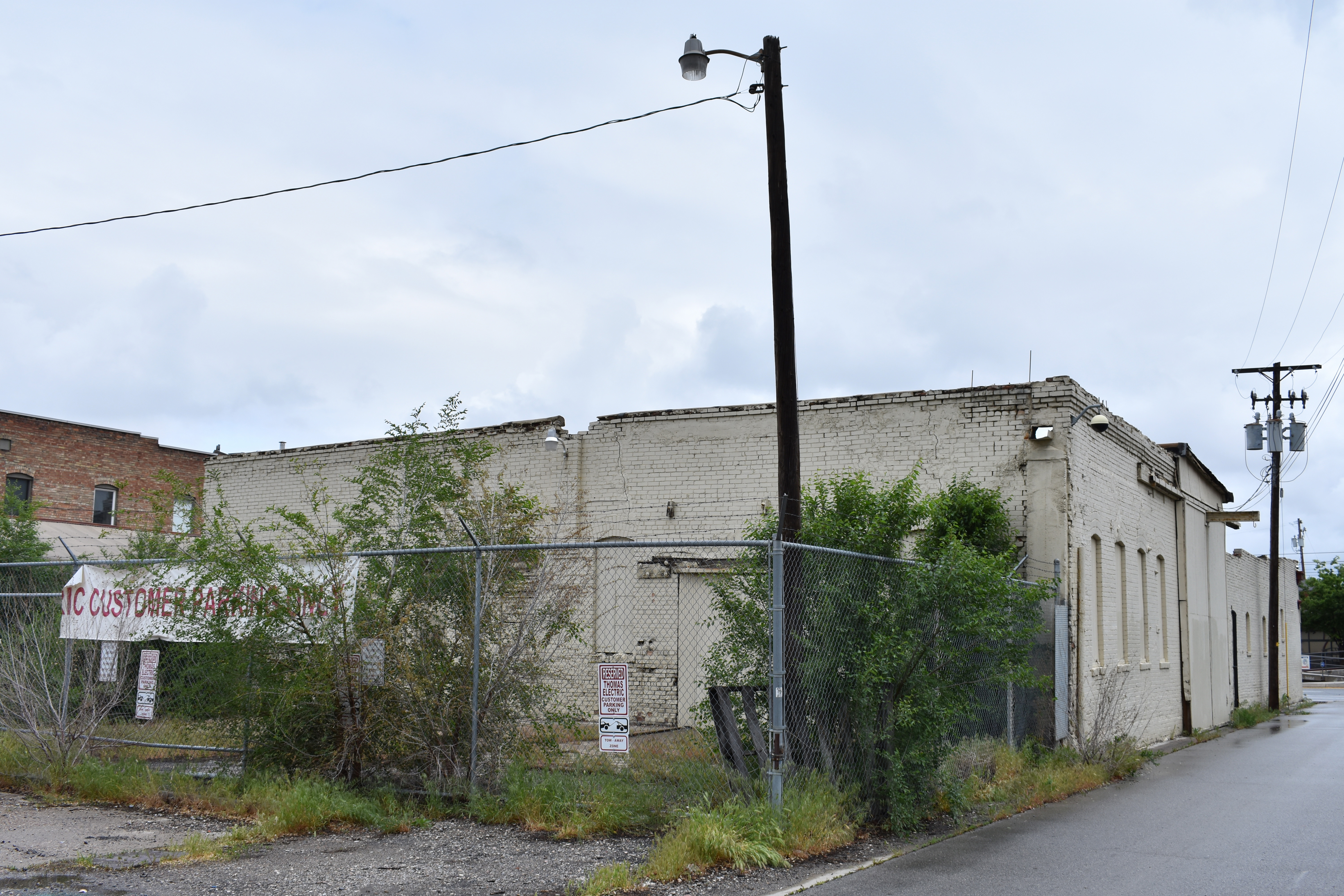
- A rear and side view of the Building at Rear, 537 West 200 South in 2019

- Location within Utah Location within the United States
- Location: Rear, 537 W. 200 South, Salt Lake City, Utah
- Coordinates: 40°45′52″N 111°54′21″W
- Area: 0 acres (0 ha)
- Built: 1910
- MPS: Salt Lake City Business District MRA
- NRHP reference No.: 82004849
- Added to NRHP: December 27, 1982

The Building at Rear, 537 West 200 South in Salt Lake City, Utah, is a two-story brick building constructed about 1910 in the city's ethnic Greek neighborhood. It is one of only three buildings along 200 South between 500 and 700 West to retain its historic integrity, and the Building at Rear, 537 West 200 South was added to the National Register of Historic Places in 1982.

The Building at Rear, 537 West 200 South was constructed for Greek immigrant Nicholas D. Stathakos, an importer and owner of a steamship and railway ticket agency. Stathakos also had interests in banking and real estate. The Building at Rear, 537 West 200 South was first occupied by George S. Fundas as a candy store. The building may have been used as a hotel or boarding house, and Fundas lived at the site. In the 1920s Karlin Kraak lived in the Building at Rear, 537 West 200 South, where he operated a contracting business. Peter Crison and Andrew Dokos operated the Grecian Bakery at the site 1929–1942.

== See also ==
- Building at 561 West 200 South
