= Salt Lake City Public Library system =

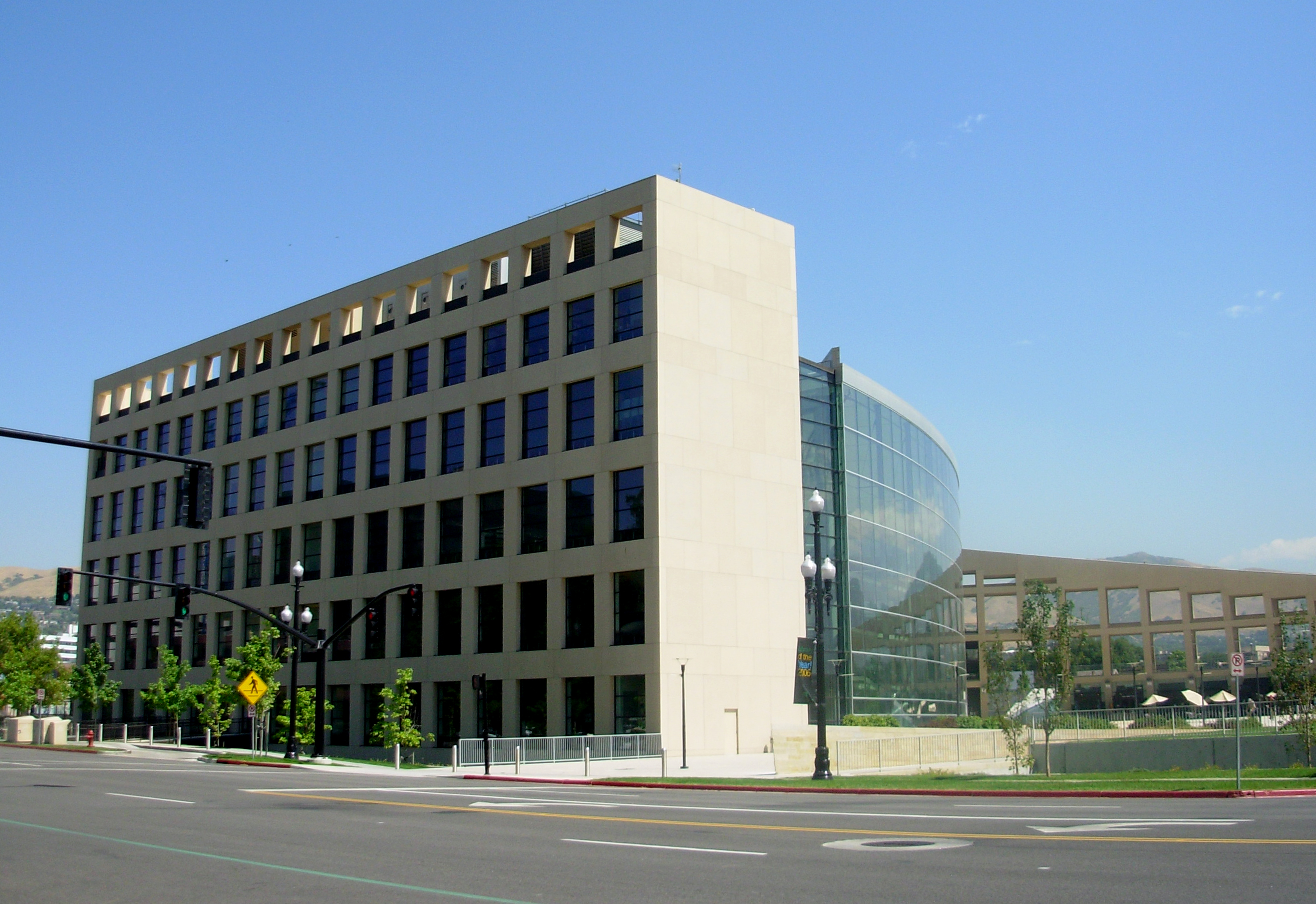
The Main Branch of the Salt Lake City Public Library system

The Salt Lake City Public Library system is a network of public libraries funded by Salt Lake City. The Free Public Library of Salt Lake City first opened on February 14, 1898. The system is under the direction of a library board and circulates more than three million items each year.

There are nine locations: the Main Branch library downtown, the Anderson-Foothill Branch, the Chapman Branch in Poplar Grove, the Day-Riverside Branch in Rose Park, the Sprague Branch in Sugar House, the Corrine & Jack Sweet Branch in the Avenues, the Glendale Branch (opened in February 2015), and the Marmalade Branch in the Marmalade neighborhood of Capitol Hill (opened in February 2016).

== Territorial years ==
The Church of Jesus Christ of Latter-day Saints oversaw many of the libraries in early Salt Lake City and the rest of the Utah Territory, founded in 1850. While many locals tried to promote public lending libraries, private libraries were the most prosperous in early Salt Lake. For many years private libraries were the only ones accessible to the people of the city.

Over these territorial years several groups attempted to establish a free public library, including a small group of women called the Ladies Library Association and a Masonic Order in the city. By 1891, the two organizations had acquired a stock of over 10,000 books, but lack of funding forced the two to donate their collections to the newly formed Pioneer Library Association. By 1898, another group of women called the Ladies Literary Society had successfully promoted a bill in the territorial legislature giving a levy on property tax to public libraries in the state. Because of this law, the Free Public Library of Salt Lake City, the city's first government-run free public library, opened on February 14, 1898. Its temporary location was on the top floor of the Salt Lake City and County Building, and the collection consisted mainly of a stockpile of 11,910 books donated by the Pioneer Library Association. The Pioneer Library Association also provided a librarian for the new library, Annie E. Chapman, for whom the current Chapman branch is now named.

== State Street ==
By 1900 the library had outgrown its housing, and attention was turned to acquiring a larger, more permanent location. Again the Ladies Literary Society helped out by persuading the mining millionaire John Quackenbos Packard to donate land and money for a new location. The new location was at 15 South State Street in a building that cost $100,000 at the time. The new library opened in 1905 with a new librarian, Joanna Sprague, for whom the Sprague branch is now named. This building would serve as the main branch library until October 1964, when a new library was built at 209 East 500 South.

During this library's service, the library system was expanded to include eight branches. The Chapman branch was originally located at 610 West North Temple but moved to 577 South 900 West in 1917 when the city was awarded $25,000 from the Carnegie Corporation of New York to build a Carnegie library. The new Chapman branch opened on May 28, 1918. The Sprague branch in the Sugar House District opened in 1914, originally at 1035 East 2100 South, but moved to its present location at 2131 South 1100 East in 1928. In 1935 the American Library Association dubbed the branch the "Most Beautiful Branch Library in America". The Main Branch library on State Street was listed on the National Register of Historic Places in 1979, and the Sprague Branch was listed in 2003.

== Branch expansion ==
When this library began to outgrow its home in the 1960s, a new site was acquired at 209 East 500 South. The groundbreaking ceremony occurred on December 28, 1962, and the building was finished on October 30, 1964. Though many old library branches were closed down during the latter half of the 20th century, several more were built. The Rose Park Branch opened in 1965, and the Corinne and Jack Sweet Branch in The Avenues and Anderson-Foothill Branch both opened in 1985. In 1996 the Rose Park Branch was replaced by the Day-Riverside Branch.

After celebrating the library system's 100th anniversary in 1998, taxpayers were asked to fund the building of a new Main Branch library building in downtown. Sixty-eight percent of voters approved an $84 million bond to build the new library. Several architects submitted plans, but the firms of Moshe Safdie and Associates partnered with local Salt Lake City firm, VCBO Architecture, were eventually chosen. Ground broke at 200 East 500 South (on the same block as the 1964 library) in October 2000, and construction was completed on February 8, 2003.

== See also ==
- Salt Lake County Library Services
