= Central City, Salt Lake City =

Central City
- Neighborhood of Salt Lake City
- Interactive map of Central City
- Coordinates: 40.759131°N 111.878467°W
- Country: United States
- State: Utah
- City: Salt Lake City

Area
  - Total: 1.00 sq mi (2.6 km^{2})

Population (2020)
  - Total: 10,932
  - Density: 10,900/sq mi (4,220/km^{2})

Ethnicity (2020)
  - White: 66.5%
  - Hispanic: 17.7%
  - Asian: 8.5%
  - Black: 4.7%
  - Native American: 1.4%
  - Pacific Islander: 0.9%
  - Two or more: 4.7%

Economics
  - Median income: $46,790
- ZIP Codes: 84102, 84111
- Area code: 801, 385

Central City is a core neighborhood of Salt Lake City, Utah. It serves as a bridge between downtown Salt Lake City and lower density residential neighborhoods on its east side. The neighborhood has seen an immense amount of redevelopment in recent years.

== Geography ==
The neighborhood includes the area east of downtown. It is bounded by South Temple Street, 700 E, 900 S, and 200 E.. The neighborhood is directly north of Liberty Park.

To the North is The Avenues, to the East is East Central, to the South is Liberty Wells, and to the West is Downtown

== History ==
The Salt Lake Valley was used as seasonal hunting grounds by the Northwestern Shoshone, the Ute, and the Goshute peoples for thousands of years prior to 1846.

Due to the neighborhood's proximity to Salt Lake's Temple Square, the neighborhood was settled not long after the Mormon Pioneers Arrived.

St. Mark's Cathedral, the primary cathedral of the Episcopal Diocese of Utah was constructed in the northwest of the neighborhood between 1870 and 1903.

The neighborhood, like many others in Salt Lake City, was built around the Streetcar. The city's main streetcar depot was built in the neighborhood in 1908. When streetcar systems were replaced nationwide, the depot sat unused for decades. In 1972, the depots were converted to a shopping center, dubbed Trolley Square. The block also houses a historic 97-foot tall water tower, which was also preserved and has become a landmark in the city.

The neighborhood has attracted an immense amount of Transit-Oriented Development due to the TRAX Red Line and various other urban amenities and popular destinations such as Trolley Square, Liberty Park, the Salt Lake City Library, and the University of Utah.

== Education ==
The neighborhood is home to the Salt Lake City School District's main offices. While the neighborhood has no public schools, many schools are nearby. Bennion Elementary, Liberty Elementary, Bryant Middle, and East High are all within four city blocks.

== Transportation ==
The UTA's TRAX Red Line runs through the neighborhood in the median of 400 South with 15-minute frequencies.

200 S has a dedicated bus lane either way through the neighborhood with stops reminiscent of other BRT lines UTA operates.

The neighborhood has an extensive network of dedicated bike infrastructure including the 9 Line Trail on the South side 900 S, which runs from its ends at Redwood Road and the 9th and 9th Neighborhood.
