= List of Salt Lake City neighborhoods =

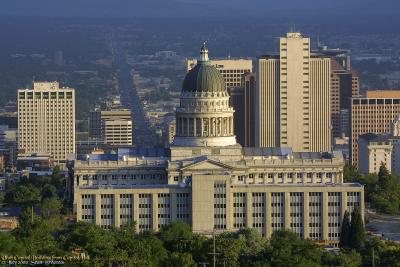
The Utah State Capitol viewed from Capitol Hill

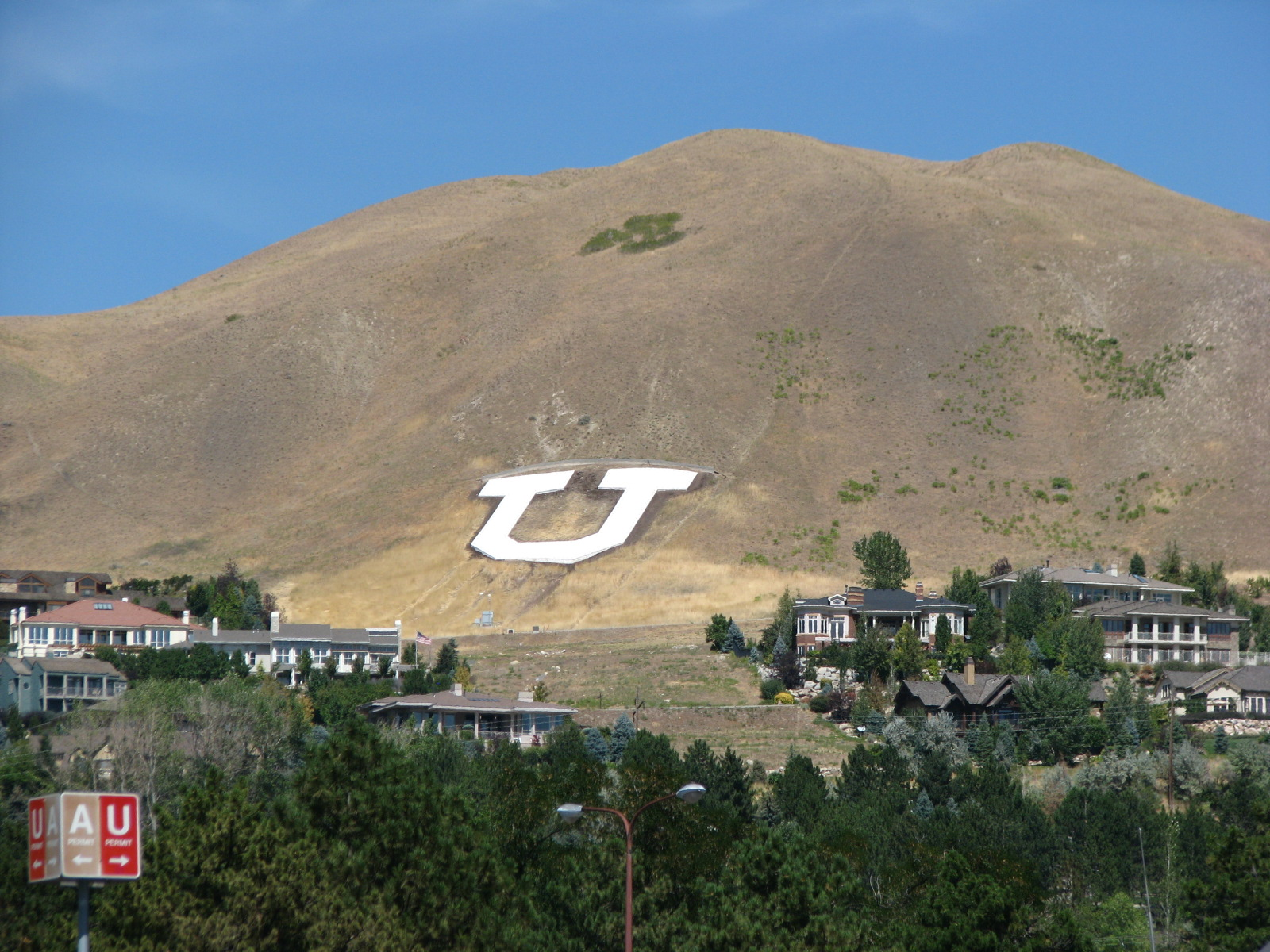
Mount Van Cott in Federal Heights

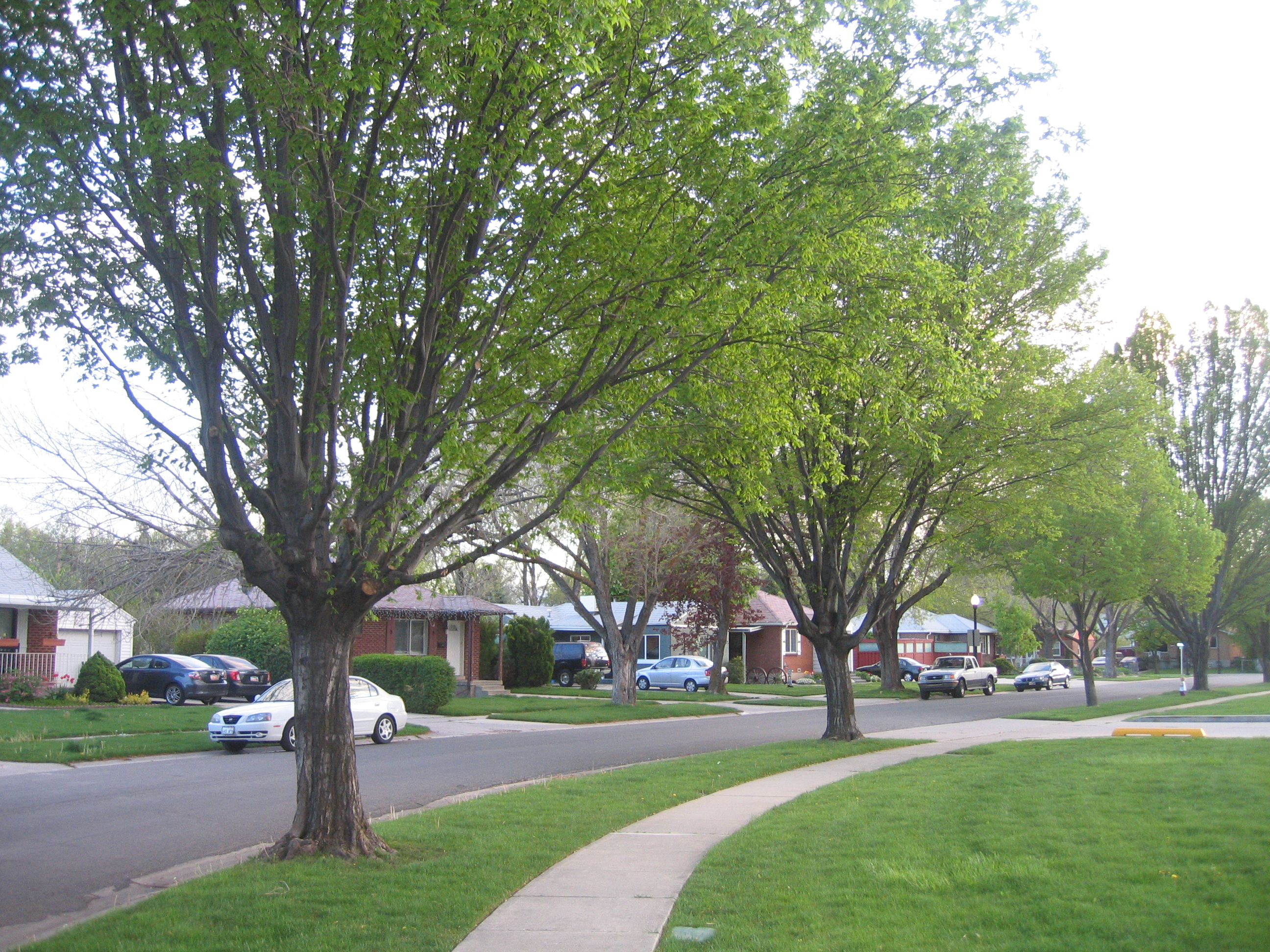
Rose Park

This is a list of neighborhoods in Salt Lake City. As a major city, Salt Lake City urbanized in the early 1900s and now has many distinct neighborhoods.

== Large or prominent neighborhoods ==
- 9th and 9th, running south from 800 South to 1300 South and east from 800 East to 1100 East. Named for the intersection of 900 East and 900 South. Overlaps with East Central.
- The Avenues, extending north from South Temple to city limits and running east from State Street to Virginia Street.
- Ballpark, running south from 700 South to 2100 South and east from Interstate 15 to State Street. Named for Smith's Ballpark.
- Capitol Hill, extending north from South Temple to the city limits and running west from State Street to 500 West. Named for the Utah State Capitol.
- Central City, running south from South Temple to 1300 South and east from State Street to 700 East. Overlaps with Liberty Wells.
- Downtown, running south from South Temple to 700 South and west from State Street to Interstate 15.
- East Bench, extending south from Emigration Canyon Road to city limits and east from Foothill Drive to city limits.
- East Central, running south from South Temple to 900 South and east from 700 East to the University of Utah. Overlaps with Yalecrest.
- Fairpark, running north from North Temple to 600 North and west from 500 West to 1460 West. Named for the Utah State Fairpark.
- Federal Heights, running north from South Temple to Federal Heights Drive and east from Virginia Street to the University of Utah.
- Glendale, extending south from 950 South (the 9 Line Trail) and west from Interstate 15 to city limits.
- Jordan Meadows, running north from North Temple to 700 North and extending west from 1460 North to city limits.
- Liberty Wells, running south from 900 South to 2100 South and east from State Street to 700 East. Overlaps with Central City.
- Marmalade District, running north from 300 North to 500 North and west from Center Street to Quince Street. Named after imported apricot and pear trees and is notable as Salt Lake City's gayborhood. Located within Capitol Hill.
- Poplar Grove, running south from North Temple to 950 South and extending west from Interstate 15 to city limits.
- Rose Park, extending north from 600/700 North to city limits and running west from Interstate 15 to Redwood Road. Named for the rose-shaped street pattern.
- Sugar House, extending south from 1700 South and west from Foothill Drive to city limits.
- University, running north from Sunnyside Avenue to Campus Drive and extending east from 1400 East to city limits. Named for the University of Utah.
- Westpointe, extending north from 700 North to city limits and west from Redwood Road to city limits.
- Yalecrest, running south from Sunnyside Avenue to 1300 South and east from 1300 East to 1900 East. Named for several streets named after Ivy League universities. Overlaps with East Central.

== Smaller neighborhoods ==
- Bonneville Hills, running south from 1300 South to 1700 South and east from 1900 East to Foothill Drive.
- Central 9th, running south from 600 South to Mead Avenue and west from Main Street to 300 West. Located within Ballpark and Downtown.
- East Liberty Park, running south from 800 South to 1700 South and east from 700 East to 1300 East. Named for Liberty Park. Overlaps with East Central.
- Foothill/Sunnyside, running south from Sunnyside Avenue to 1300 South and east from 1900 East to Foothill Drive.
- Sunnyside East, running south from Sunnyside Avenue to 1300 South and east from Foothill Drive to Crestview Drive.
- University Gardens, running south from South Temple to 500 South and east from 900 East to the University of Utah. Located within East Central.
- Wasatch Hollow, running south from 1300 South to 1700 South and east from 1300 East to 1900 East.
