= Education in Salt Lake City =

In 1847, pioneer Jane Dillworth held the first classes in her tent for the children of the first Mormon families. By 1850, many schools had formed around the Salt Lake Valley, and there were plans for a school attached to every wardhouse. In 1851, the territorial legislature passed the first public school law creating the office of the superintendent of schools. Many large Mormon families, such as the family of Brigham Young, had their own schools, known as "family schools".

In the last part of the 19th century, there was much controversy over how children in the area should be educated. Mormon influence in public schools created problems with non-Mormon parents, and raised issues about public school supervision. Mormons became upset about the growing number of private Protestant schools in the area. The schools would offer free tuition to Mormon students in order to convert them. Westminster College, although now a secular four-year college, is the last remaining example of these schools. LDS Church members also resented non-Mormon influences in the public schools and began to focus once again on efforts to develop church-run schools.

Many Mormon students in grades 9–12 attend some form of religious instruction, referred to as seminary. In years past students would attend during school hours and even receive credit for it. Although many still attend during school hours, they no longer receive any credit.

As of 2024, Utah ranks last in the nation for per-pupil education spending.

== See also ==
- Education in Salt Lake County
- Salt Lake City School District
- University of Utah
