= Poplar Grove, Salt Lake City =

Poplar Grove
- Neighborhood of Salt Lake City
- Poplar Grove Boulevard
- Interactive map of Poplar Grove
- Country: United States
- State: Utah
- City: Salt Lake City

Area
  - Total: 7.40 sq mi (19.2 km^{2})

Population (2020)
  - Total: 12,847
  - Density: 1,740/sq mi (670/km^{2})

Ethnicity (2020)
  - Hispanic: 50.4%
  - White: 32.2%
  - Pacific Islander: 5.9%
  - Asian: 4.4%
  - Black: 2.7%
  - Native American: 1.0%
  - Two or more: 2.8%

Economics (2020)
  - Median income: $49,419
- ZIP Codes: 84104, 84116
- Area code: 801, 385

Poplar Grove is a western neighborhood of Salt Lake City, Utah. It lies north of Glendale and south of Rose Park & Fair Park. It is the second largest neighborhood in Salt Lake City (after Glendale) and is often confused with Glendale.

== History ==
Red Iguana 2, a Mexican restaurant, in Poplar Grove

Poplar Grove broke off from Glendale in the 1990s, following Salt Lake City Neighborhood Guidelines by submitting paperwork to the Salt Lake City Council for approval. Poplar Grove existed as a neighborhood long before Glendale was created. It got its name from a grove of trees the Edwin Rushton family planted in the area that became known as "Poplar Grove" in the late-1800s. Being the first neighborhood in Salt Lake City to change the original set boundaries, Poplar Grove now has its own community council with elected board members.

== Geography ==
The boundaries are east I-15, West to Salt Lake City boundaries at 5600 West. Although there is less than a dozen houses West of Redwood Road (1700 West) The South Border is approximately 900 South (the true Southern border with Glendale is the old rail road tracks which are no longer there, having been converted to the new nine line trail). The northern border is North Temple bordering Fair Park from I-15 to 1000 West and Rose Park from 1000 West to 5600 West.

== Education ==
Poplar Grove is home to 2 elementary schools: Franklin Elementary School and Edison Elementary School, which currently houses a magnet gifted and talented program for the Salt Lake City school district. Students are then promoted to either Glendale or Bryant Middle School, and are bussed to East High School.
