= Library Square =

Library Square may refer to:

- Salt Lake City Public Library, with an outside plaza called Library Square, Utah, United States
- Vancouver Library Square, a city block, including the central library branch, in downtown Vancouver, Canada
