= Tower Theatre (Salt Lake City) =

Movie theater in Salt Lake City, Utah, United States

- Tower Moving Pictures Theater, Tower Talkies
- The Tower Theatre undergoing renovation in 2026
- Interactive map of Tower Theatre
- Address: 876 East 900 South; Salt Lake City, Utah; United States
- Coordinates: 40.749809°N 111.865947°W
- Owner: Salt Lake Film Society
- Capacity: 340
- Type: cinema

Construction
- Opened: January 8 or 10, 1928
- Years active: 98
- Architect: Samuel Campbell

Website
- Website

The Tower Theatre, located in the 9th and 9th neighborhood of Salt Lake City, Utah, is a historic film theater operated by the Salt Lake Film Society.

The theater (with the Broadway Centre Cinemas, also owned by the society) screens classic and independent films, and hosts a movie-rental library. The theater became a venue for the Sundance Film Festival in 1992.

Since 2020, the theater has been closed and undergoing renovations. As of September 2026, the Film Society aims to reopen the theater in late 2028 or early 2029.

== History ==
The theater was built by Samuel Campbell in late 1927 and opened January 8 or 10, 1928. The Tower Theater is the oldest movie theater in the Salt Lake Valley that still operates today, and was the first air-conditioned movie theater in the city.

Its original façade resembled the Tower of London, but this was removed in 1950. It was equipped with a Kilgen organ during the silent film era. The theater converted to sound films in 1930 and became known as "Tower Talkies." It was the first to screen sound films in the state.

The theater closed in 1988 and remained vacant until it reopened on July 26, 1991. In 2001, the Tower Theater was saved from demolition, and the nonprofit Salt Lake Film Society was established to manage the theater.

The theater closed in March 2020 during the COVID-19 pandemic and in the aftermath of the 2020 Salt Lake City earthquake. The Salt Lake Film Society purchased the Tower Theater building in December 2022. In August 2023, they announced plans to renovate the building. In March 2026, the Salt Lake Film Society filed paperwork to begin a "preliminary facade deconstruction," with the aim "to better understand what’s left of its original 1928 facade."
