= Fairpark, Salt Lake City =

Neighborhood in Salt Lake City, Utah, United States

Fairpark
- Neighborhood of Salt Lake City
- Interactive map of Fairpark
- Country: United States
- State: Utah
- City: Salt Lake City

Area
  - Total: 1.11 sq mi (2.9 km^{2})

Population (2020)
  - Total: 6,699
  - Density: 6,040/sq mi (2,330/km^{2})

Ethnicity (2020)
  - White: 43.9%
  - Hispanic: 41.5%
  - Asian: 2.0%
  - Black: 3.6%
  - Pacific Islander: 3.2%
  - Native American: 1.6%
  - Two or more: 3.8%

Economics (2020)
  - Median income: $77,272
- ZIP Codes: 84116
- Area code: 801, 385

Fairpark is a western neighborhood of Salt Lake City, Utah. It lies north of Poplar Grove and south of Rose Park. It is one of the smaller neighborhoods in Salt Lake City and is often confused with Rose Park. The neighborhood is named after the State Fairpark, which takes up a large portion of the area. It is home to over 2,800 households and is less than a 5-minute drive to downtown Salt Lake City. Near the state fairpark is the Northwest Recreation Center, which houses a large indoor pool and several community programs. For more information about Fairpark, visit the Fairpark Community homepage.

== Geography ==
On the east it is bordered by 500 West and extends west to 1460 West, then following the Jordan River to 700 North, the boundary then curves down to 600 North back to 500 West. On its south, Fairpark is bordered by North Temple which features the iconic restaurant, Red Iguana. This area is rich with diversity, and growing as the city expands west. The neighborhood includes smaller community areas including Guadalupe, Jackson, and Onequa.

== Education ==
It had one public school, Mary W. Jackson Elementary School, which housed a successful Spanish dual immersion program. In 2024, the Salt Lake City School District voted to close four elementary schools, including Mary W. Jackson. Students now attend elementary schools in nearby Rose Park: Backman, Rose Park, and Newman elementary, which is where the Spanish DLI program was moved following Mary W. Jackson’s closure. Students attend either Bryant or Northwest middle schools, and then are promoted to West High School.

== Notable residents ==
Fairpark is also home to local artist Ann Pineda, whose paintings were featured at the Anderson-Foothill Branch of the Salt Lake City Library in October, 2015.
