= Oscar M. Booth House =

- U.S. National Register of Historic Places
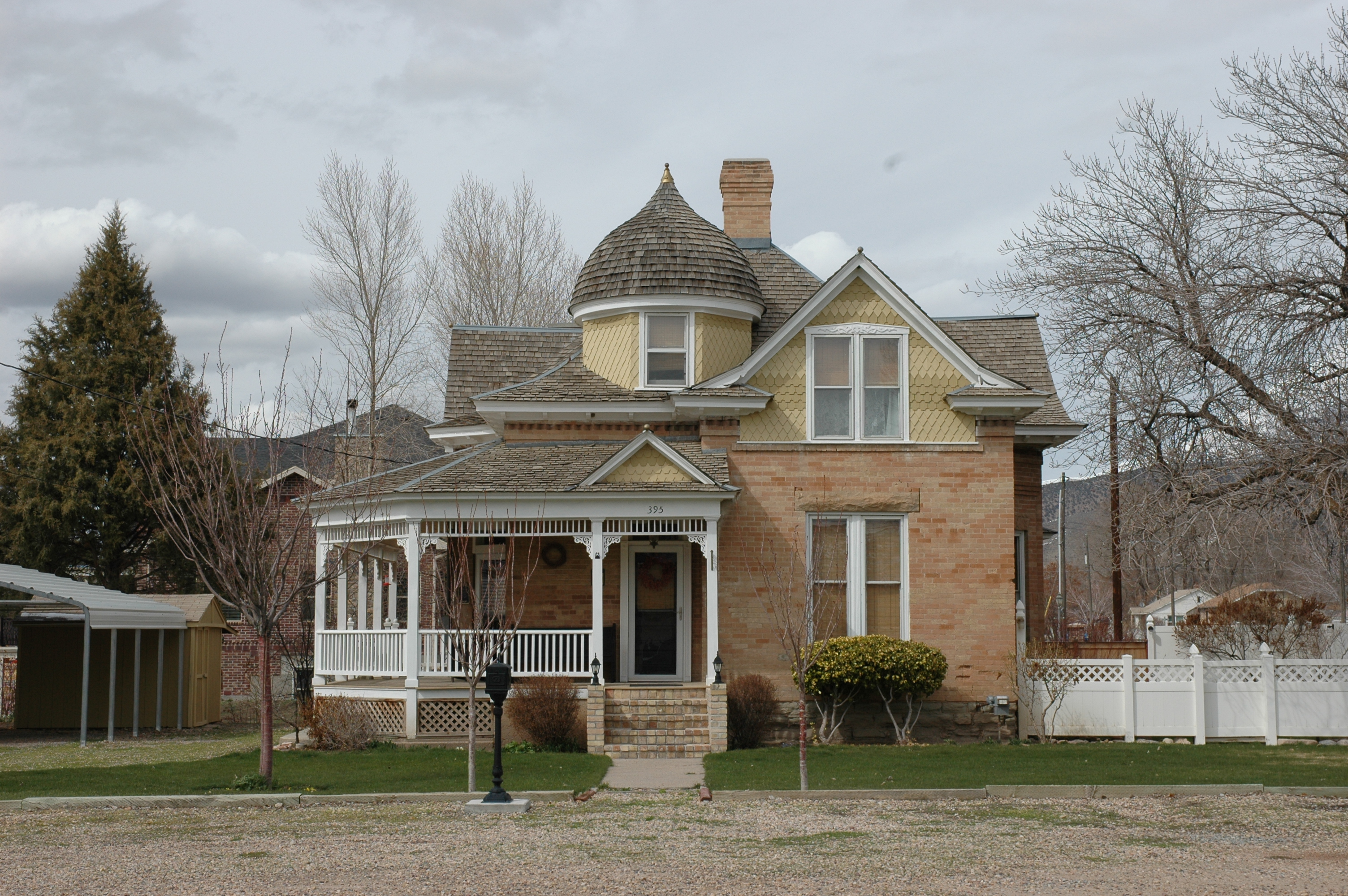

- Location within Utah Location within the United States
- Location: 395 E. 100 South, Nephi, Utah
- Coordinates: 39°42′32″N 111°50′19″W
- Area: less than one acre
- Built: 1893
- Built by: Booth, Oscar M.
- Architectural style: Queen Anne
- NRHP reference No.: 83004399
- Added to NRHP: April 18, 1983

The Oscar M. Booth House, at 395 E. 100 South in Nephi, Utah, was built in 1893 with Queen Anne styling. It was listed on the National Register of Historic Places in 1983.

It has an octagonal corner tower and other decorative elements of Queen Anne style. It was built by carpenter Oscar M. Booth (1868-1944).

Its National Register nomination asserts it is "a fine example of the Queen Anne architectural style in Utah," but explains:

Lacking the exhuberant [sic] massing and textured complexity of the most well defined Queen Anne examples, the Booth house is a complete if subdued statement of the style and reflects its typical, or vernacular, form in Utah. The house type itself is identified [sic] by a side-hall plan and asymmetrical massing, while decorative elements such as the shingled gables (the use of masonry walls precluded the varied wall surface textures associated with the style), the long wrap-around porch, and the octagonal tower with conical roof, consistently articulate the stylistic principles of the Queen Anne. The Booth house is historically significant because it helps to record the assimilation of the picturesque Victorian aesthetic into the mainstream of popular architecture in late nineteenth-century Utah. Further, Oscar M. Booth was a local carpenter-builder who is best known in the Nephi area for his design of the Whitmore Mansion (National Register 1978). Nephi is a rural agricultural area some eighty miles south of Salt Lake City. / Booth's background remains obscure, but it seems likely that he lacked formal architectural training and acquired his working knowledge of Victorian design through actual house building experience and from the numerous house pattern-books which dominated the trade during this period. It is reported that he worked during the 1880s and 1890s in Nephi (the Whitmore Mansion was not completed until 1898) and is responsible for many of the fine Victorian homes found there. In the 1890s, oral sources indicate that he worked on several homes in the Avenues area of Salt Lake City. The Arthur O. Clark House at 1059 East 3rd Avenue (National Register, Avenues Historic District, Salt Lake City 1980), built in 1895, is a mirror-image copy of the Booth house. The similarities between the two houses are striking and point out an important but often overlooked aspect of Victorian architecture, namely the persistence at the vernacular level of a traditional design process built around the interplay between particular house "types," identified by their basic floorplan and massing, and various configurations of exterior stylistic trim. The Clark and Booth houses are at once the same and different, they share a common plan but differ in external details. The continued identification, recording, and study of such dwellings will, in the future, make a significant contribution to the general understanding of architecture in Utah during the later nineteenth-century.
