= 145th Field Artillery Monument =

Memorial in Salt Lake City, Utah, U.S.

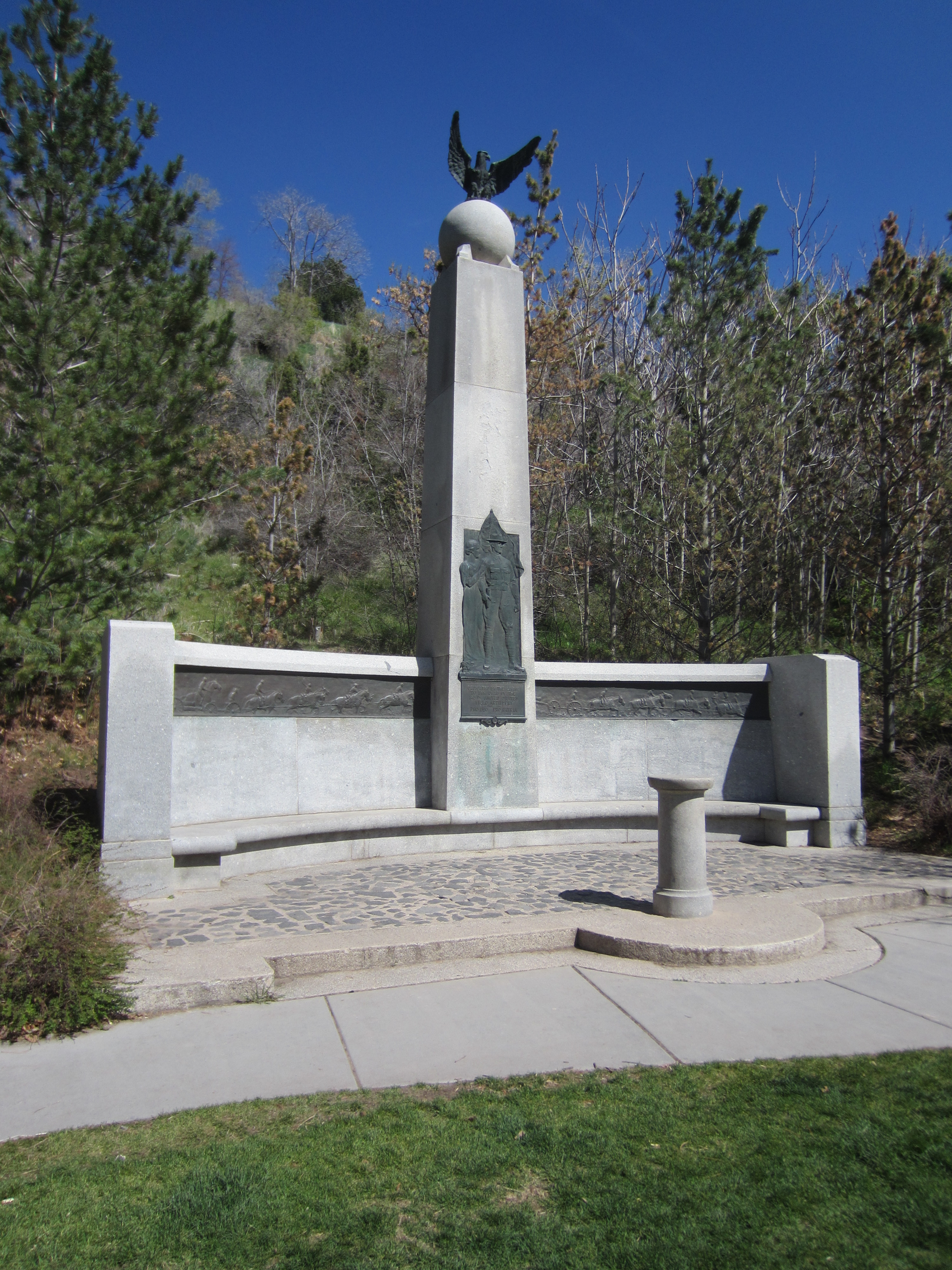
- The monument in 2021
- Location: Memory Grove, Salt Lake City, Utah, United States
- Coordinates: 40°46′40.9″N 111°53′4.6″W

145th Field Artillery Monument is a memorial in Salt Lake City's Memory Grove, in the U.S. state of Utah. Dedicated in 1927, the monument was erected by the 145th Field Artillery and has a gray granite shaft and circular bench. The bas-relief sculpture depicts horses and men. The memorial once featured a sundial.
