= Zucker Fountain =

Fountain in Memory Grove, Salt Lake City, Utah, U.S.

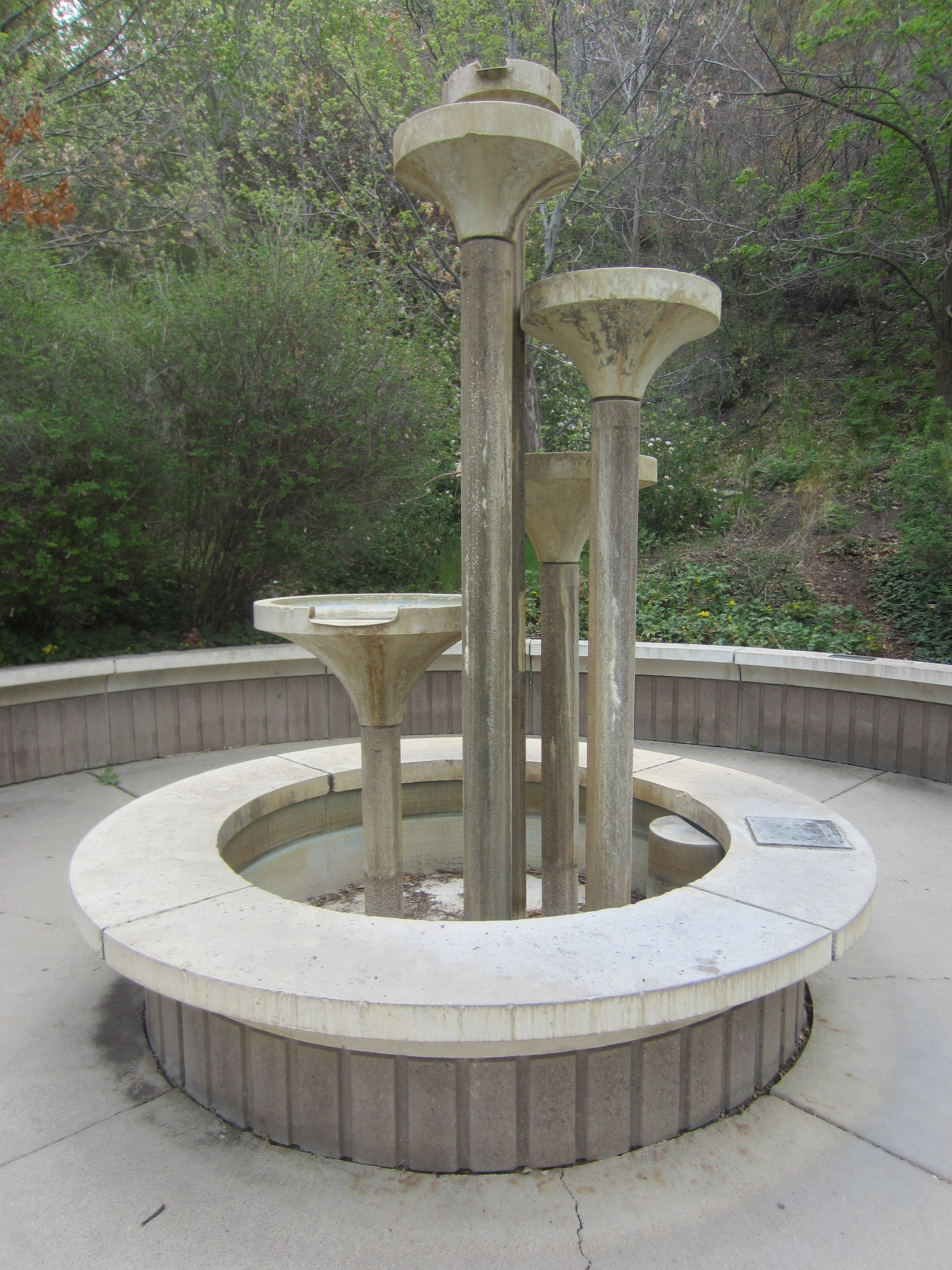
- The fountain in 2021
- Location: Salt Lake City, Utah, U.S.; 40°46′35″N 111°53′5.7″W

The Ethel Zucker Memorial Fountain, or simply Zucker Fountain, is a fountain and memorial installed in Salt Lake City's Memory Grove, in the U.S. state of Utah.
