= Meditation Chapel =

Monument in Salt Lake City, Utah, U.S.

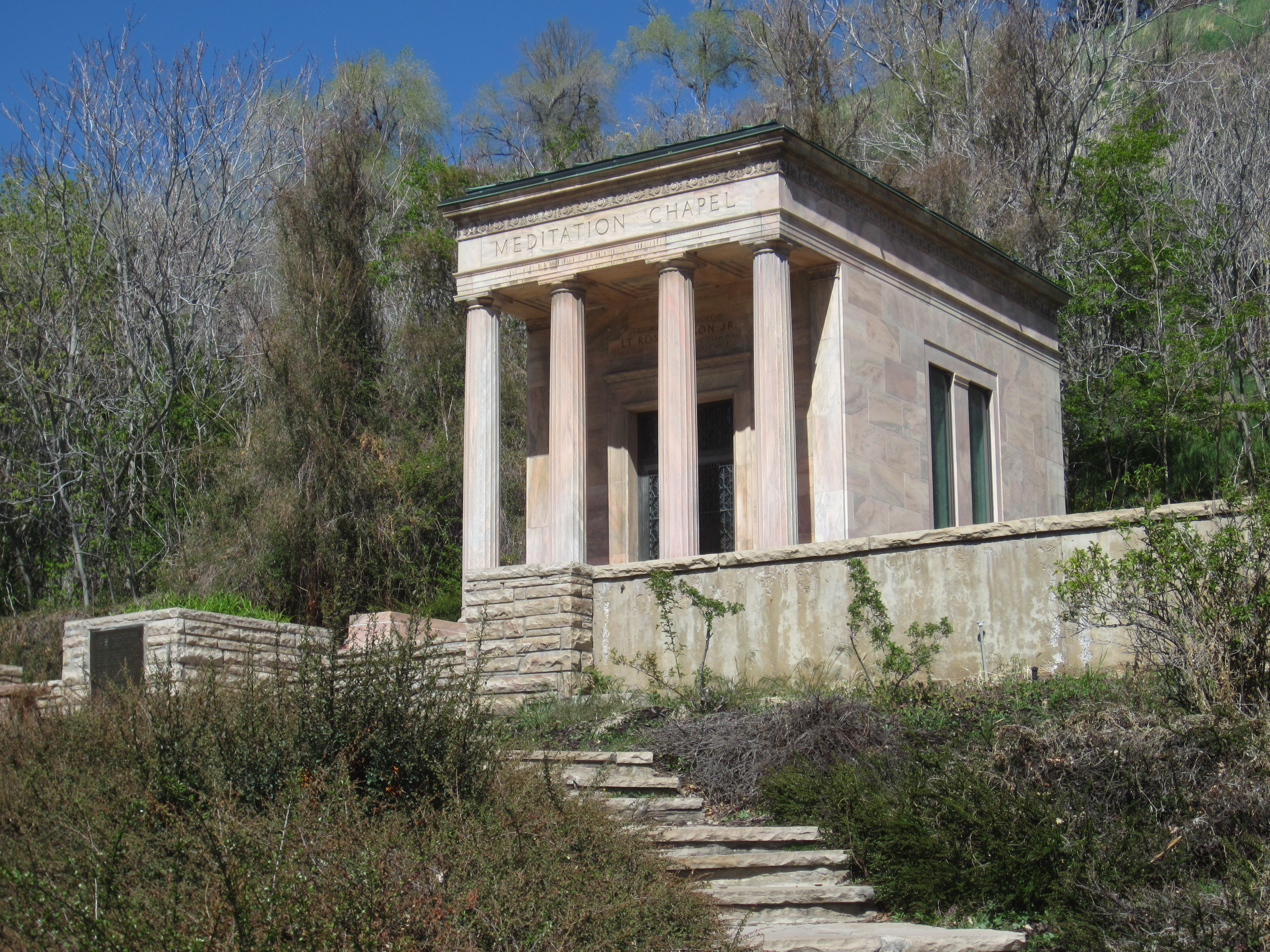
- The Meditation Chapel in 2021
- Interactive map of the Meditation Chapel area

General information
- Location: Salt Lake City, Utah, United States
- Coordinates: 40°46′39.6″N 111°53′4.1″W

The Meditation Chapel is located in Salt Lake City's Memory Grove, in the U.S. state of Utah. The structure was built by Mr. and Mrs. Ross Beason in 1948 to commemorate their son and others killed during World War II. It is made of Georgian marble, a copper roof, and bronze doors. The Memory Grove Foundation restored the chapel's stained glass windows, earning the group a Utah Heritage Foundation Heritage Award in 1999.

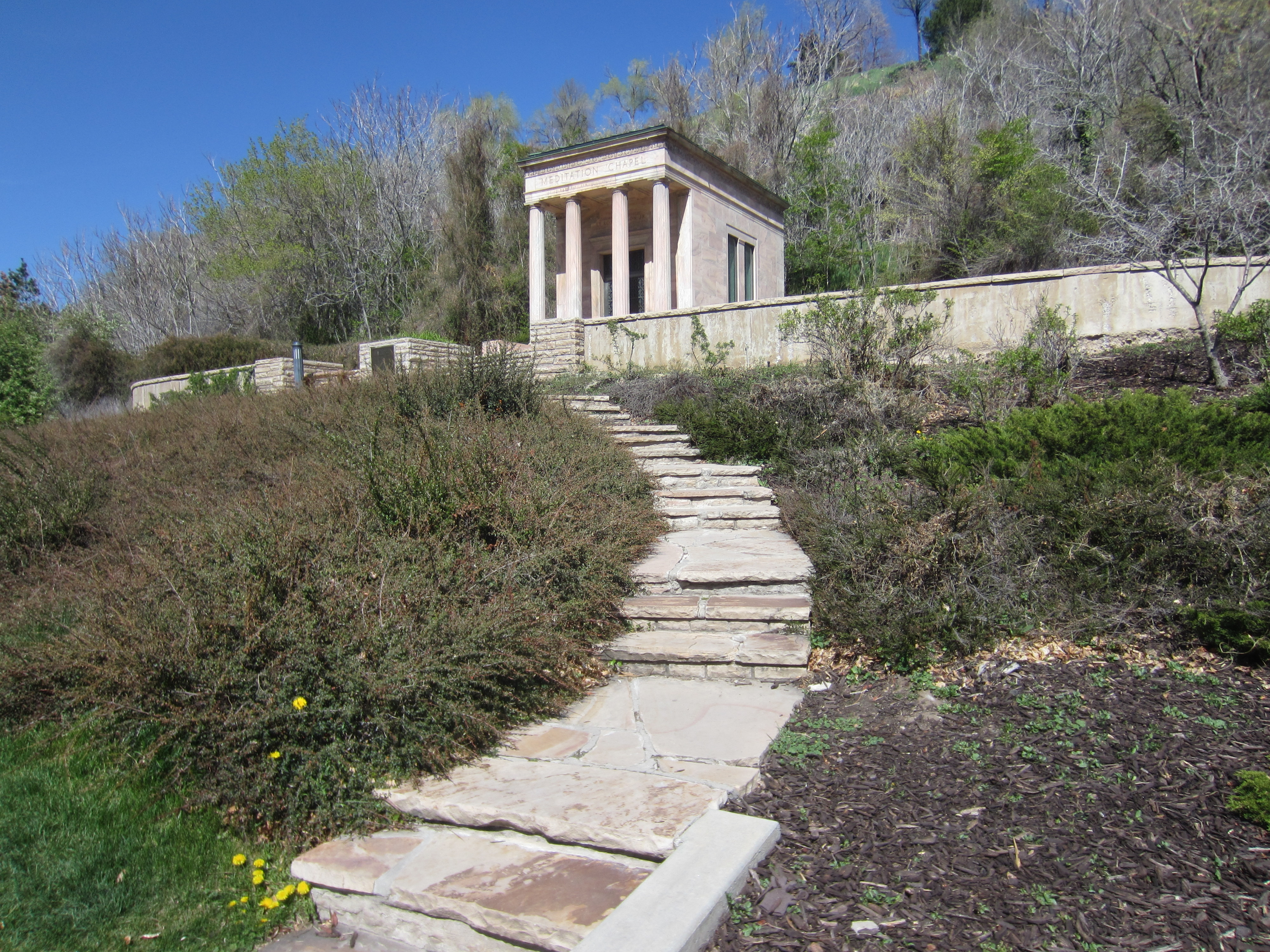

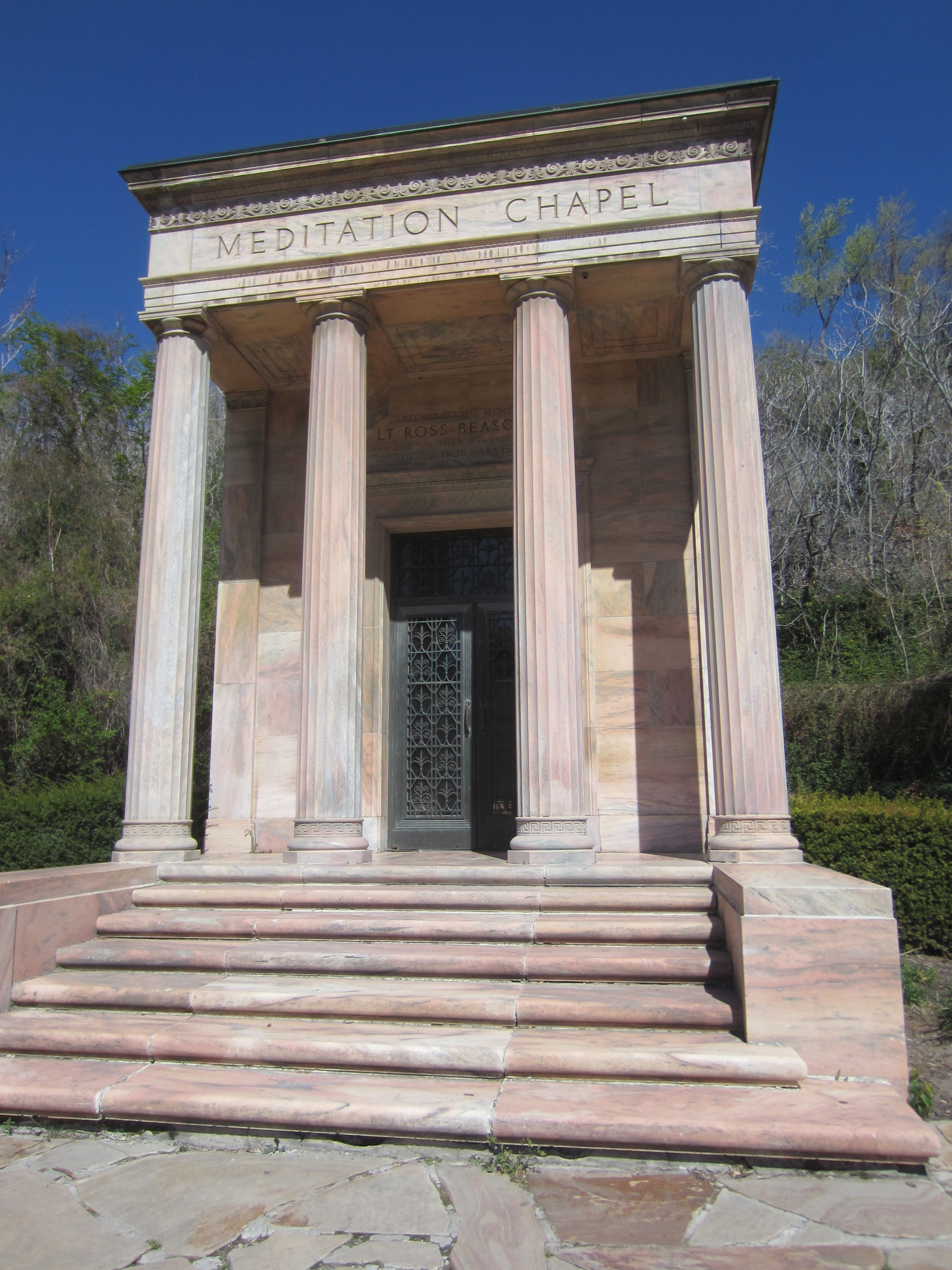
