= Salt Lake County Library Services =

Public library system in Salt Lake County, Utah, United States

The Draper branch of Salt Lake County Library Services

Salt Lake County Library Services is a system of free public libraries serving the population throughout Salt Lake County, Utah. Salt Lake County Library Services is currently ranked 5th in the United States among libraries serving a population of 500,000 or greater. This is the sixth time the County Library System has ranked among the top in the nation.

== History ==
Salt Lake County Library Services began operations early in 1939, when the first location was housed in two school rooms in the old Midvale, Utah School. Small libraries were subsequently established in several county schools. The library was immediately very popular with the residents, issuing library cards to 1,700 patrons between January and April 1939. The first Salt Lake County Library Board was established a year earlier, in 1938, and members included Dr. C. N. Jensen, Dr. Calvin S. Smith, Alf G. Gunn and County Commissioner J. R. Rawlins. Ruth Vine Tyler, a former school teacher and Salt Lake City librarian, was chosen as the first library director.

The grand opening of the Midvale Library Headquarters was held on August 9, 1941. On September 1, 1971, Guy Schuurman, former Weber County Librarian, succeeded Tyler as the director of the system ushering in an era of growth and innovation. By 1972 the system was the largest library system in the state with 11 buildings, 132 employees and more than 125,000 card-carrying patrons.

The Utah Best in State Award for libraries went to Salt Lake County in 2005 citing the substantial contribution the library system has made in improving the quality of life in Utah. The library's innovation and creativity in applying new technologies to enrich customers' library experience was acknowledged as well as the library's fiscal responsibility.

Salt Lake County Library Services, currently under the leadership of Director James D. Cooper, circulated almost 14.5 million items in 2008, and houses a collection of more than 2 million items. Circulation has increased 45% since 2000, the number of library card holders has increased 29.5% to over 600,000, and the number of library sponsored programs has increased 59%.

== Branches ==
There are 18 full-service branches in the system located throughout Salt Lake County, and two smaller library outlets. The branches are as follows: Bingham Creek, Daybreak, Draper, Granite, Herriman, Holladay, Hunter, Kearns, Magna, Millcreek, Riverton, Sandy, South Jordan, Taylorsville, Ruth Vine Tyler, West Jordan, West Valley, and Whitmore. The outlets are the Alta Reading Room and the library at the county jail.

== See also ==
- Salt Lake City Public Library system
