= Amanda Conk Best House =

Historic house in Utah, United States

- U.S. National Register of Historic Places
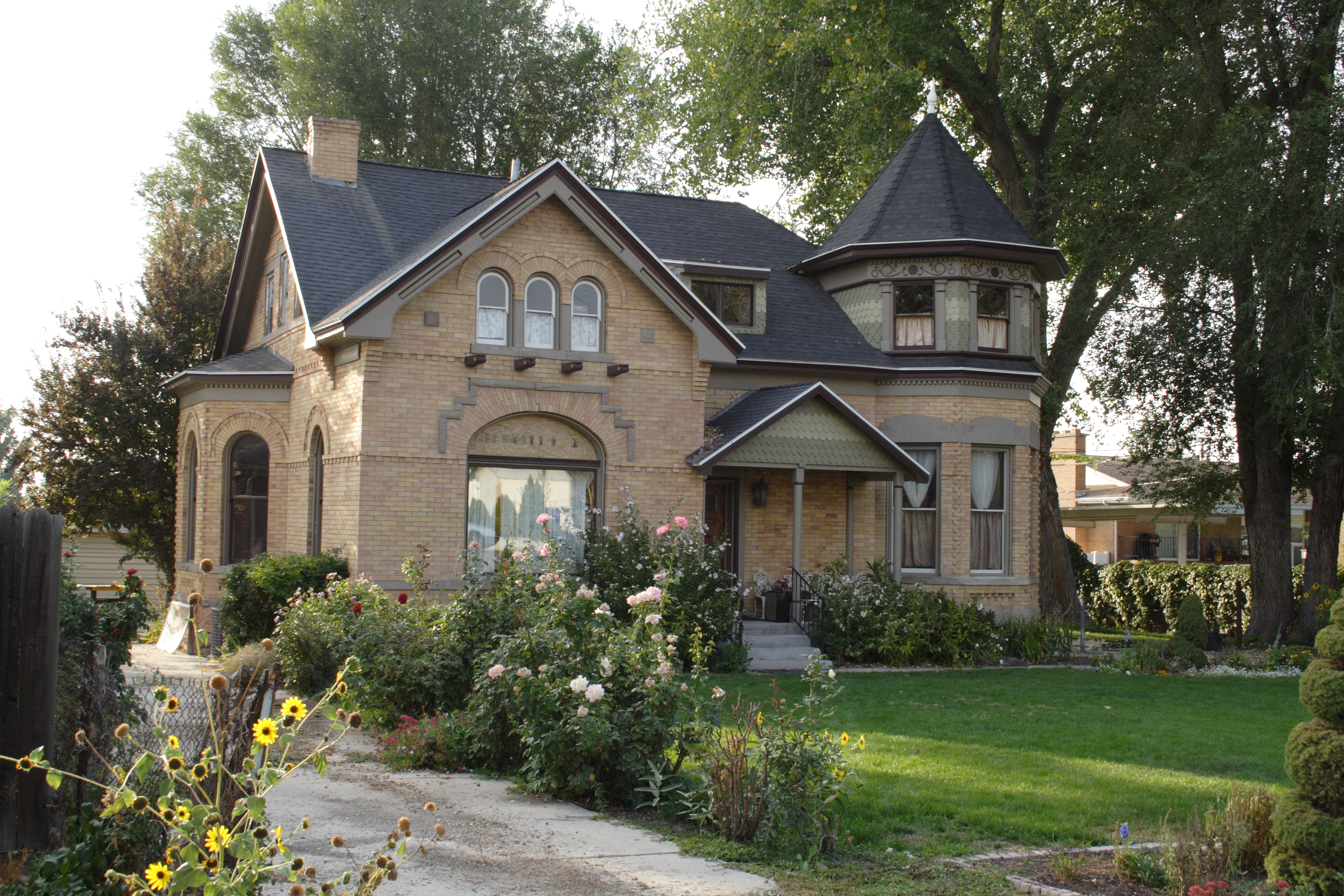

- Location within Utah Location within the United States
- Location: 3622 S. 1100 E., Millcreek, Utah
- Coordinates: 40°41′33″N 111°51′36″W
- Area: 0.3 acres (0.12 ha)
- Built: 1896
- Architect: Anderson, Herman H.; Brain, Charles J.
- Architectural style: Late Victorian, Queen Anne
- NRHP reference No.: 08001154
- Added to NRHP: December 4, 2008

The Amanda Conk Best House, at 3622 South 1100 East in Millcreek, Utah, was built in 1896. Also known as the Boyle House, as the Beal House, and as the Aoki House, it is a brick Queen Anne style house that was listed on the National Register of Historic Places in 2008.

It was built for Amanda James Conk Best, a polygamous wife of Alfred Best, and is important as an unusual example for its time and place, as a large Queen Anne style house built out in rural Salt Lake County.

It has a twin, the Barlow House in the Avenues Historic District in Salt Lake City.
