= Korean War Wall of Honor =

War memorial in Salt Lake City, Utah, U.S.

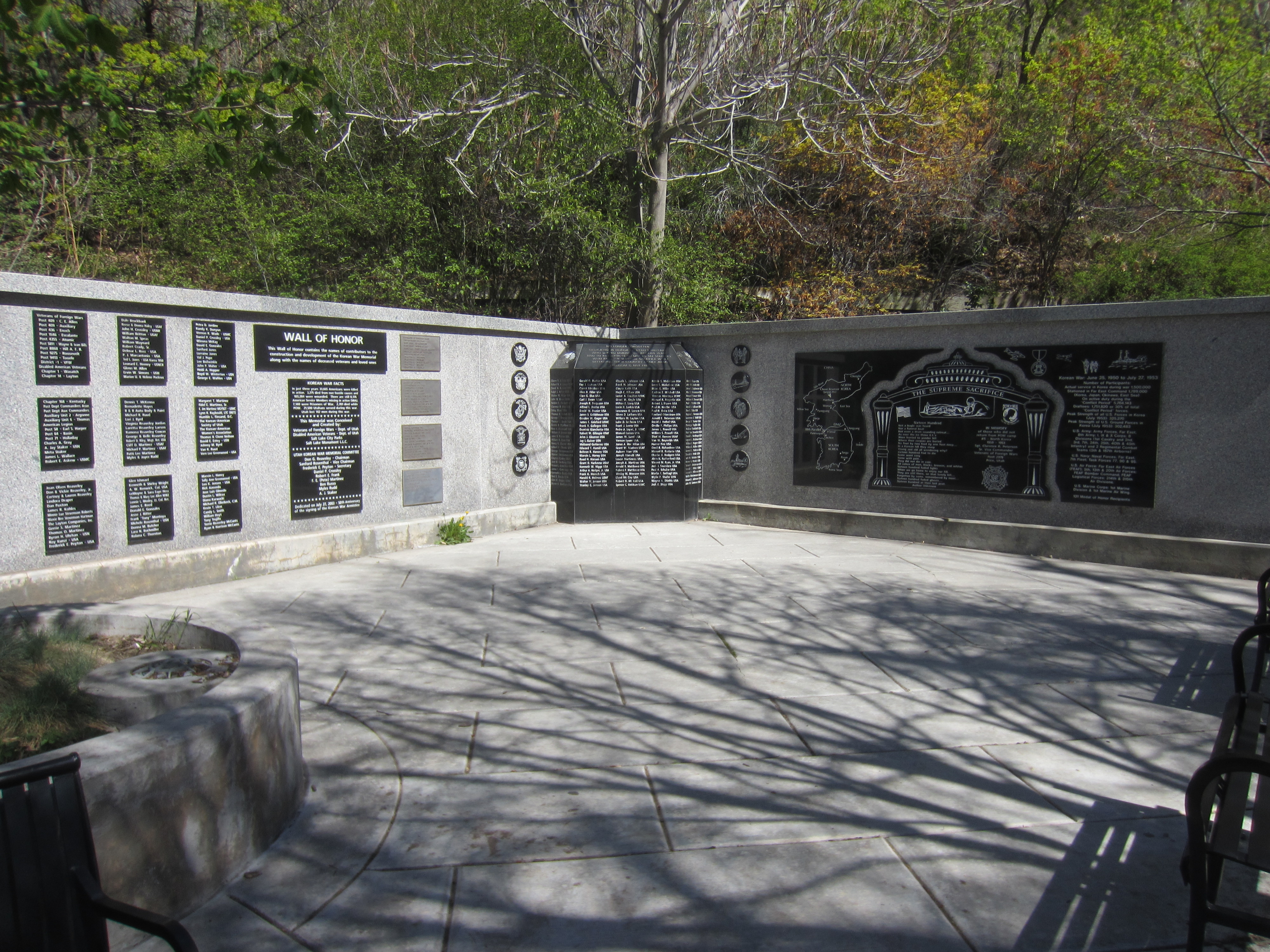
- Location: Memory Grove; Salt Lake City, Utah, United States
- Coordinates: 40°46′36.4″N 111°53′4.6″W

The Korean War Wall of Honor, or Utah Korean War Memorial, is a war memorial Memory Grove in Salt Lake City, Utah, United States.
