= Rose Park, Salt Lake City =

Neighborhood of Salt Lake City

Rose Park
- Neighborhood of Salt Lake City
- Interactive map of Rose Park
- Country: United States
- State: Utah
- City: Salt Lake City

Area
  - Total: 3.00 sq mi (7.8 km^{2})

Population (2020)
  - Total: 10,513
  - Density: 3,500/sq mi (1,350/km^{2})

Ethnicity (2020)
  - White: 47.4%
  - Hispanic: 38.0%
  - Black: 3.4%
  - Asian: 3.1%
  - Pacific Islander: 2.7%
  - Native American: 1.1%
  - Two or more: 3.8%

Economics (2020)
  - Median income: $69,937
- ZIP Codes: 84116
- Area code: 801, 385

Rose Park is a neighborhood located in the northwest area of Salt Lake City, Utah, and is among the most ethnically diverse areas in Utah. Its name comes from the area's original developer, who arranged part of the area's streets in the shape of several roses, with one of its main streets, American Beauty Drive, acting as a long rose stem. This area's original roof shingles were red or green and its street names all feature rose varieties. Rose Park residents enjoy a very short commute (less than 5 minutes) to downtown, high bikeability, and many recreational amenities.

== History ==
In the 1940s and 50s, Rose Park was marketed as a reasonably priced subdivision with larger plots than older Salt Lake City neighborhoods, such as The Avenues. Developer Alan E. Brockbank intended to create affordable brick homes for GI's returning from World War II. The declaration of subdivision for Rose Park, typical of American residential developments of the period, included a racial covenant, stating: "No person of any race or nationality other than the White or Caucasian Race, shall use or occupy any building plot or lot or any portion thereof, except that this covenant shall not prevent occupancy by domestics of a different race employed by the owner or tenant."

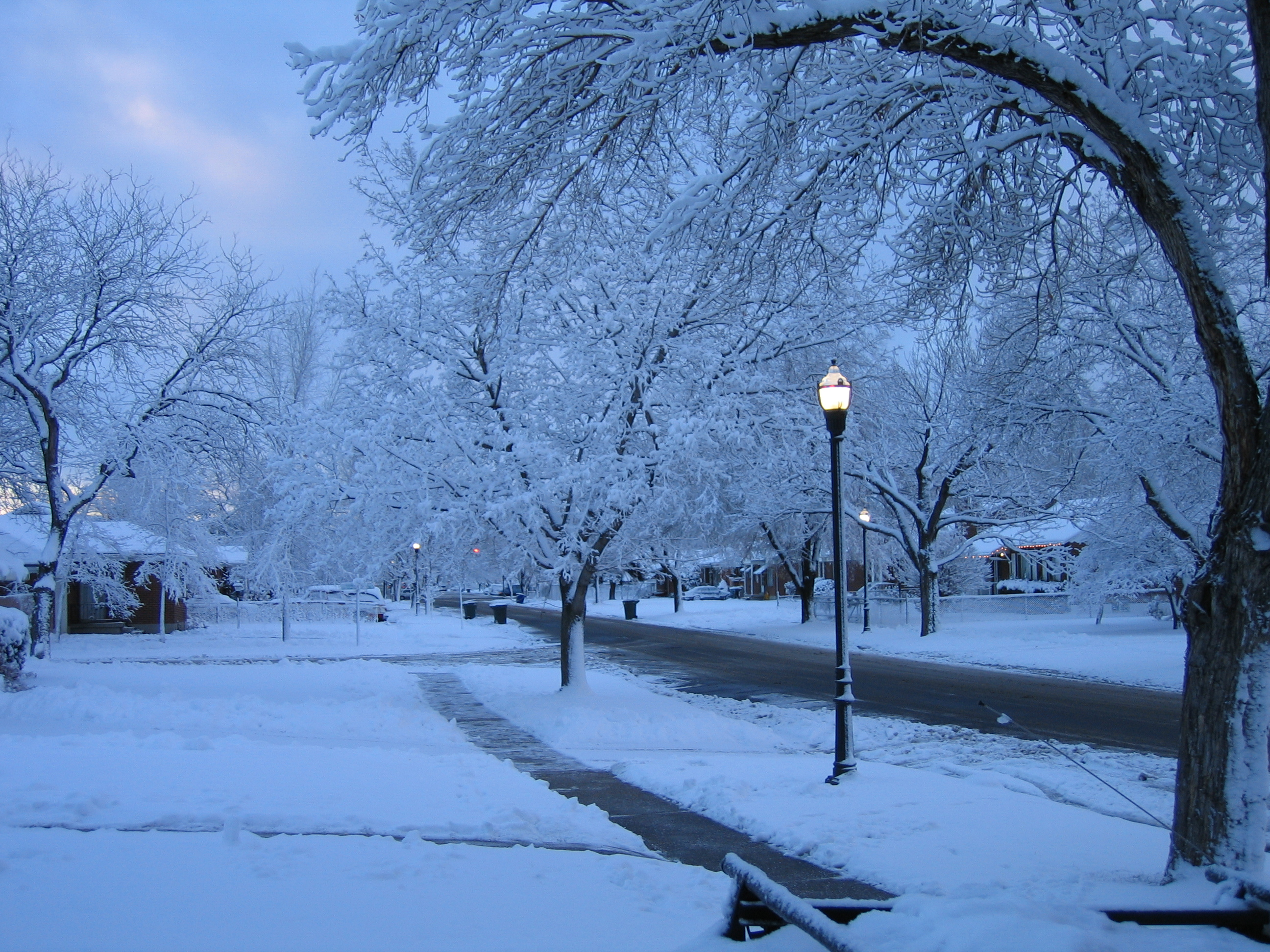
Tree-lined streets

After World War II, population and growth in the area increased as vacant plots were bought up and homes built. Like the early residents of Murray, many were non-Mormon, blue-collar workers, although Rose Park's residents often worked for major railroad companies, such as Union Pacific, Southern Pacific, and the Los Angeles-Salt Lake Railroad companies, rather than smelters, common in Murray. More recently, one can find accountants, electricians, business managers, engineers, real estate agents and brokers, architects, and police officers among Rose Park residents.

Many homes are being renovated by young families who have moved into the area. The homes are small by today's standards (averaging 1,600 to 1,800 square feet) and are generally constructed of brick though some early stick framed homes are present in the area. Trees (including many varieties of fruit trees) were planted in the neighborhood by young, World War II-era families. Rose Park now includes some of the city's largest and most densely spaced trees.

On September 8, 2020, a windstorm with category three hurricane-force winds swept through the area. The winds toppled many of Rose Park's oldest and largest trees, causing property damage and widespread power outages.

=== Super Fund site ===
In the early 1980s a hazardous site existed near Rose Park near Rosewood Park and east of the Rose Park Golf Course. The state of Utah petitioned the United States Environmental Protection Agency to add it to their list of Superfund cleanup sites. The agency agreed and in 1982 it was added to the Superfund list as "Rose Park Sludge Pit."

Local refineries dumped waste products in the sludge pit from 1930 until 1957. The acidic sludge contained carcinogenic polycyclic aromatic hydrocarbons and sulfur dioxide posing a threat to groundwater and surrounding organisms. This was particularly unnerving because much of the municipal water in Rose Park comes from scattered wells. Though no contaminants were ever detected, the threat of contamination was enough cause for action.

Amoco oil company was potentially liable for the site and agreed to clean it up in 1985. The solution entailed the construction of a slurry wall around and under the sludge pit to avoid groundwater contamination. A clay cap was also placed on top of the sludge pit and topped with grass.

Since these improvements, the contamination site has passed all of its five-year reviews with the solution deemed "protective of human health and the environment." No additional threats have been identified.

== Boundaries ==
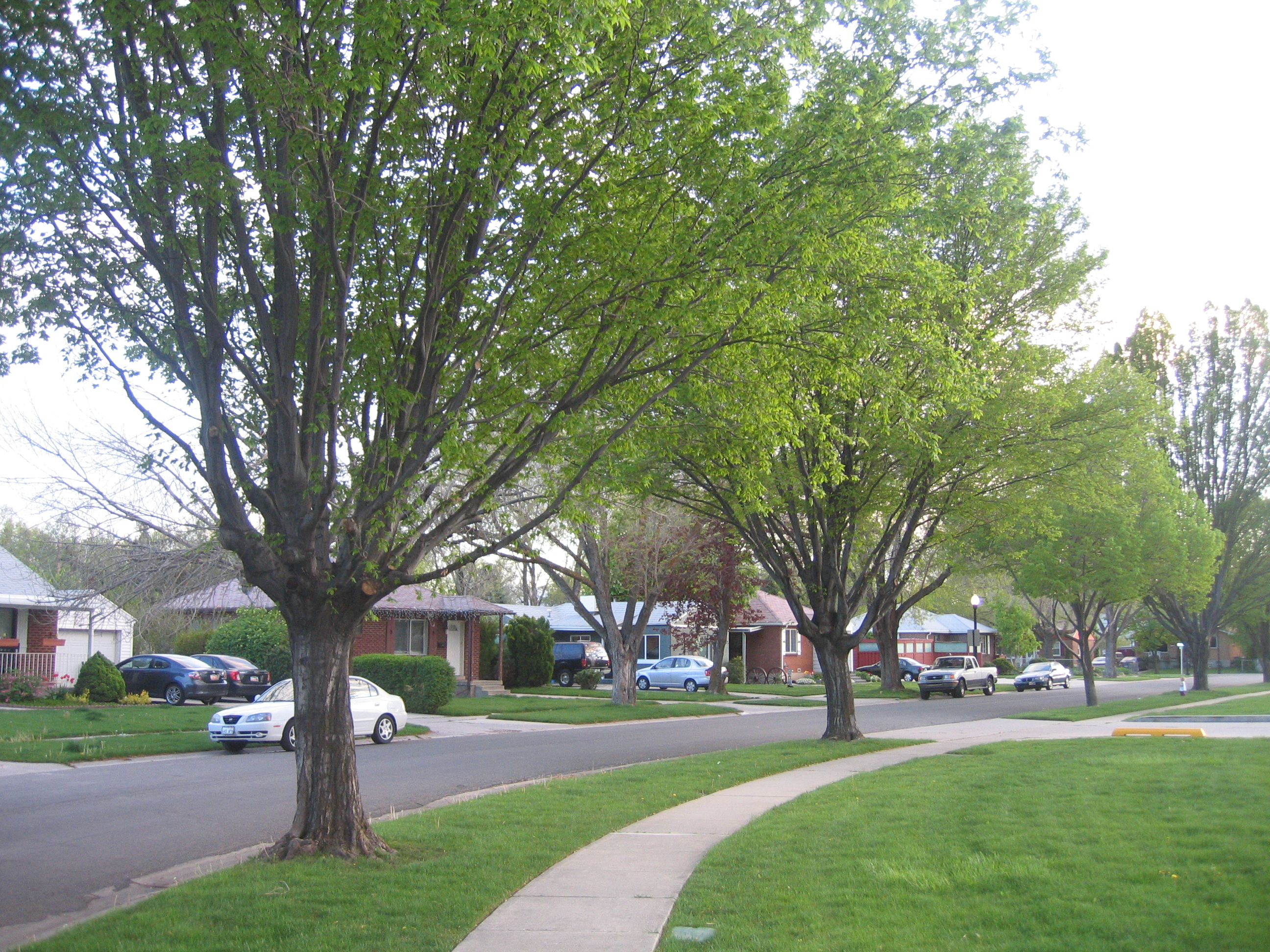
Picture Drive

Rose Park is defined as west of I-15, north of 600 North, and east of Redwood Road. The neighborhood's boundaries extend north to the city limits and the shared county line of Salt Lake and Davis Counties. Four original stone markers define Rose Park's major streets, as the original boundaries of the historic Rose Park development were between 900 West to the East, the Jordan River to the West and between 600 North and 1000 North. The area is also identifiable by its generally Post-war or Mid-century modern style architecture.

Rose Park lies north of the Fairpark and Glendale neighborhoods and west of the northwest slope of Capitol Hill. The neighborhood is often thought of as encompassing the entire urban area north and west of interstates 15 and 80, though its actual boundaries are relatively small.

The entire neighborhood falls within the boundary of West High School, the state's oldest and among its largest high schools.

== Education ==
The Rose Park neighborhood lies within the Salt Lake City School District and contains three elementary schools: Rose Park Elementary, Backman Elementary, and Newman Elementary, which currently houses a Spanish Dual Language Immersion program. The Salt Lake Center for Science Education, a charter school within the Salt Lake City School District, occupies the building and grounds of the former Northwest Middle School which moved to a new, larger location outside of the neighborhood in 2006.

The Guadalupe School is also based in Rose Park, which is a nonprofit charter organization consisting of five main academic programs for various age groups.

== Crime ==
For the last several decades, Rose Park has suffered from a negative reputation. Rose Park is often confused with Glendale, Poplar Grove, Fairpark, and other west-side communities of Salt Lake City.

Crime reports are published monthly by the Salt Lake City Police Department. These reports show that Rose Park has a rising crime rate for Salt Lake City. Similar to any other community of Salt Lake City, crime is being aggressively targeted by the police department. Rose Park is claimed by multiple gangs such as Rose Park Norteños, Rose Park Taliban/Iraqi Mafia Gang (bloods) and Rose Park Family (crips).

On April 20, 2022 Rezvan “Ray” Saisani the owner and Sameer Syed the manager of The City Inn Motel were arrested for receiving kickbacks from drugs and prostitution operations occurring within the motel.

== Culture ==
Rose Park is a culturally, religiously and ethnically diverse area, with a majority of its population being of Hispanic/Latino descent. The neighborhood is also home to several community-based groups such as The Lions Club, The Rose Park Revival Group, and The Rose Park Community Center and Gardens. Soccer is a popular and unifying sport throughout Rose Park, with residents from all parts of the neighborhood often coming together for matches.

Rose Park also holds a strong leftist political presence, and is home to pro-Chicano civil and human rights group, the Rose Park Brown Berets. The group has advocated for increased police accountability after the controversial shooting of Bernardo Palacios-Carbajal by officers from the Salt Lake Police Department, as well as economic, social, and racial equality. The Rose Park Brown Berets are also vocally opposed to gentrification, an increasingly frequent issue in many west-side Salt Lake City neighborhoods.

In recent years, Rose Park has received a new influx of young, upper-middle class, white residents, primarily drawn to the neighborhood's affordability and proximity to downtown Salt Lake City. A similar trend was observed in the nearby Sugarhouse in the late 1990s. This is an ongoing conflict throughout the Rose Park, Glendale, Fairpark, and Guadelupe areas, with longtime residents rallying against new development and the negative effects of gentrification.

== Community ==
A pathway between homes in the neighborhood

Rose Park benefits from an active community council. The Rose Park Community Council is composed of an elected body of volunteers who serve the interests of Rose Park and the community. The purpose of this council is to provide community input and information to various city departments. Community councils are encouraged to make recommendations to the city on all matters affecting the city or each organization's particular community or neighborhood. The council holds a monthly meeting, to which the public is encouraged to attend, the first Wednesday of each month, at 6:30pm, in the Day Riverside Library (located at 1575 W. 1000 North).

Rose Park is a moderately walkable neighborhood with shortcuts allowing easy access to the parks, churches and other amenities in the area. Rose Park includes:

- A public golf course
- Two parks including part of the Jordan River Parkway, tennis courts, soccer and baseball fields, pavilions, and several playgrounds. One of which hosts an annual Turkey Bowl:
- A public library and eco-garden
- Several small, family-owned restaurants and stores.
- Easy access to I-15, I-215, and the Legacy Parkway.

Rose Park holds an annual community festival each spring. Information about this festival can be found at www.roseparkfestival.org. Rose Park also made City Weekly's best of 2010 in a favorable review detailing the walkable neighborhood, nearby golf course, locally owned ethnic food, and quality of life enjoyed by residents.
