= Pagoda (Salt Lake City) =

Memorial in Salt Lake City, Utah, U.S.

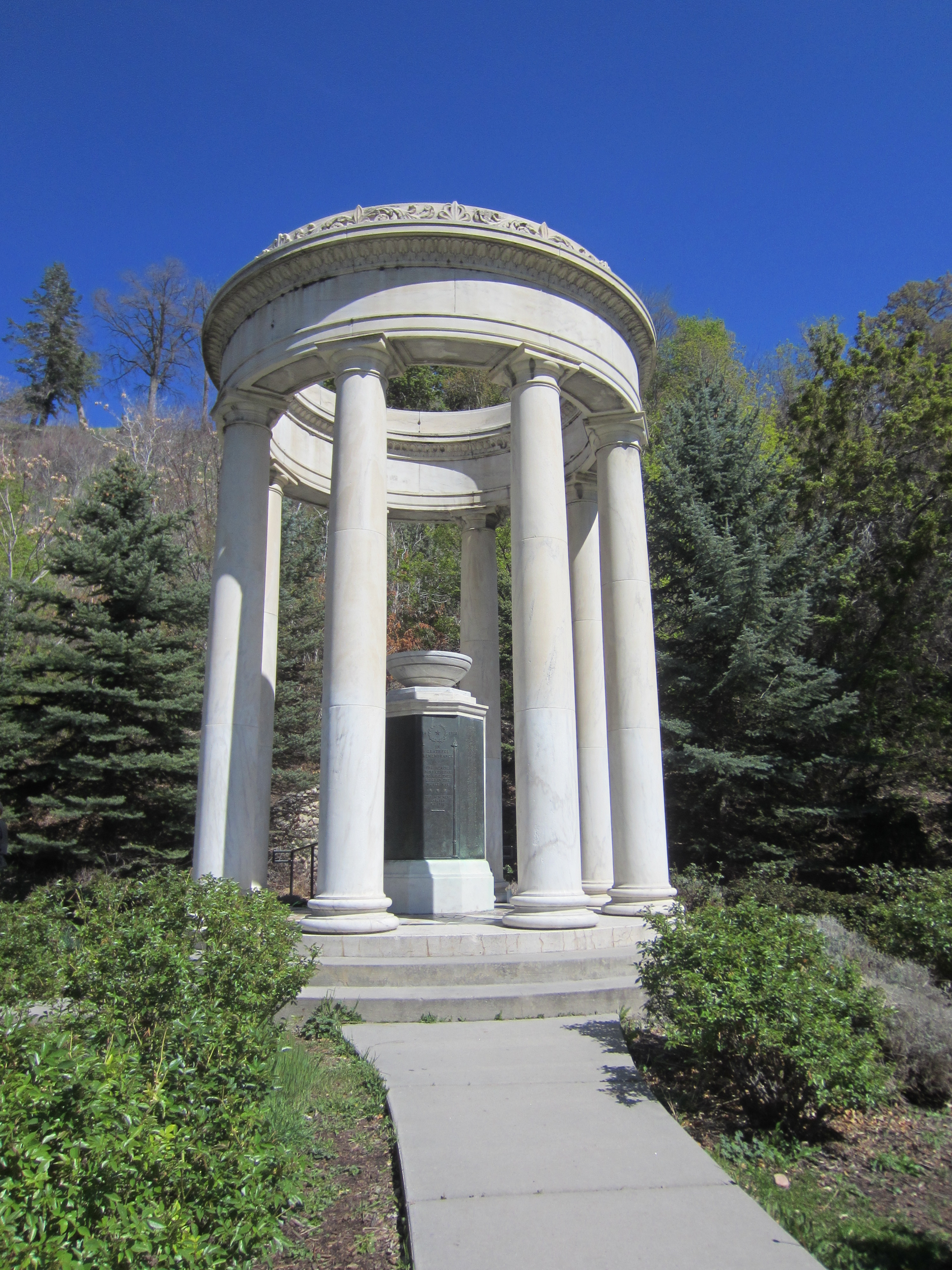
- The Pagoda in 2021
- Interactive map of Pagoda
- Location: Salt Lake City, Utah, U.S.
- Coordinates: 40.776632°N 111.884757°W
- Designer: Slack Winburn
- Type: memorial
- Material: marble
- Completion date: c. 1925
- Dedicated to: World War I casualties

The Pagoda (also known as the World War I Memorial or World War I Monument) is a memorial designed by architect and WWI veteran Slack Winburn (1895-1964), installed in Salt Lake City's Memory Grove in the U.S. state of Utah. Along with the park's entry gates, the Pagoda was built c. 1925. It was the park's first memorial using marble from Vermont, and the classical structure has eight Doric columns. The shaft and urn were added in 1932.

Winburn attended the École des Beaux-Arts in Paris, after serving in France during WWI. This classical training influenced him to create Period Revival-style designs.
