= Salt Lake Center for Science Education =

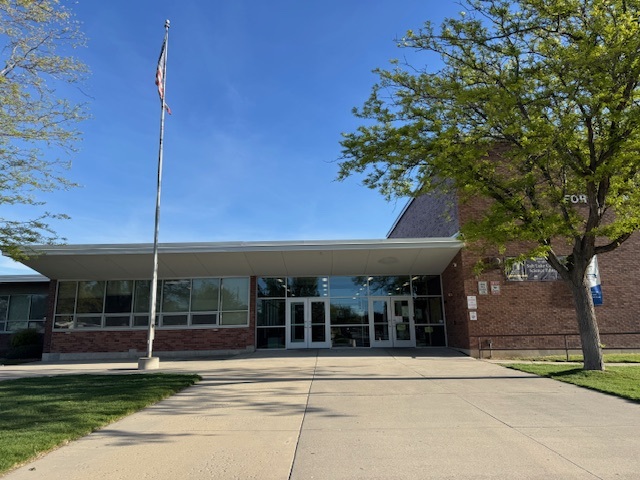

Location
- 1400 Goodwin Ave; Salt Lake City, Utah 84116; United States; 40°47′39.7242″N 111°55′52.6692″W

Information
- Type: Charter school
- Established: 2008; 18 years ago
- School district: Salt Lake City School District
- NCES School ID: 490012301208
- Principal: Britnie Powell
- Teaching staff: 21.89 (on an FTE basis)
- Grades: 9-12
- Student to teacher ratio: 16.81
- Website: https://slcse.slcschools.org/

Salt Lake Center for Science Education, also known as SLCSE, is a STEM focused charter high school in the Salt Lake City School District in Salt Lake City, Utah, United States. The school serves grades nine through twelve in general and special education. The school also serves a food pantry for students and their families.
