= East Bench, Salt Lake City =

Collection of neighborhoods in Salt Lake City, Utah

Coordinates: 40°44′N 111°50′W

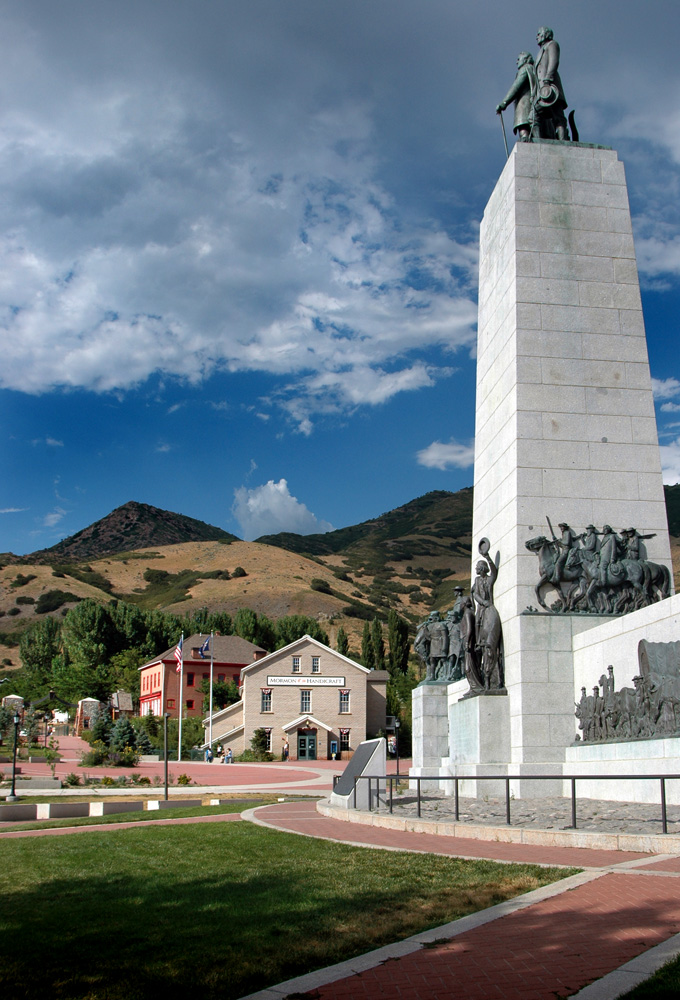
This Is The Place Heritage Park located within the Foothill neighborhood

East Bench in Salt Lake City, Utah is a relatively affluent and primarily residential neighborhood or collection of neighborhoods in Salt Lake City that lies at the base of the Wasatch Range and extends west to approximately 1300 East.

Foothill is the northern part of this area, divided by Interstate 80, and takes its name from the area's major traffic artery of Foothill Drive (State Route 186), which runs parallel to the base of the mountains and connects Interstate 80 with the University of Utah and downtown Salt Lake City.

The East Bench is bordered on the north by the Federal Heights neighborhood and on the south by the Traverse Mountains. This neighborhood becomes increasingly affluent moving from west to east.

The University of Utah sits at the north end of this neighborhood. Points of interest include the Hogle Zoo, Red Butte Garden and Arboretum, This Is The Place Heritage Park, Fort Douglas Military Museum and the Foothill Village Shopping Center.

Some notable residents and former residents include Peter Breinholt, John Bytheway, and billionaire philanthropist Jon Huntsman, Sr.

Southern East Bench neighborhoods include East Millcreek, Holladay City, Cottonwood Heights City and Granite.

Northern Foothill neighborhoods include the Country Club (near the Salt Lake Country Club), the eastern side of historic Sugar House, the Harvard-Yale Neighborhood, where many of the streets are named after schools, El Rey Park, Oak Hills (formerly the site of the Oak Hills drive-in, above Hogle Zoo), Donner Park, University Village, St. Mary's Park, and the Devonshire Neighborhood near the "H-Rock", a large rock with an H painted on it that represents Highland High School.

The East Bench has its own distinctive culture. Many residents take pride that they are part of multi-generational families who have attended the same high school.

East High School, a central feature of the area, was the high school featured in the Disney High School Musical movies.
