= Memory Grove =

Park in Salt Lake City, Utah, U.S.

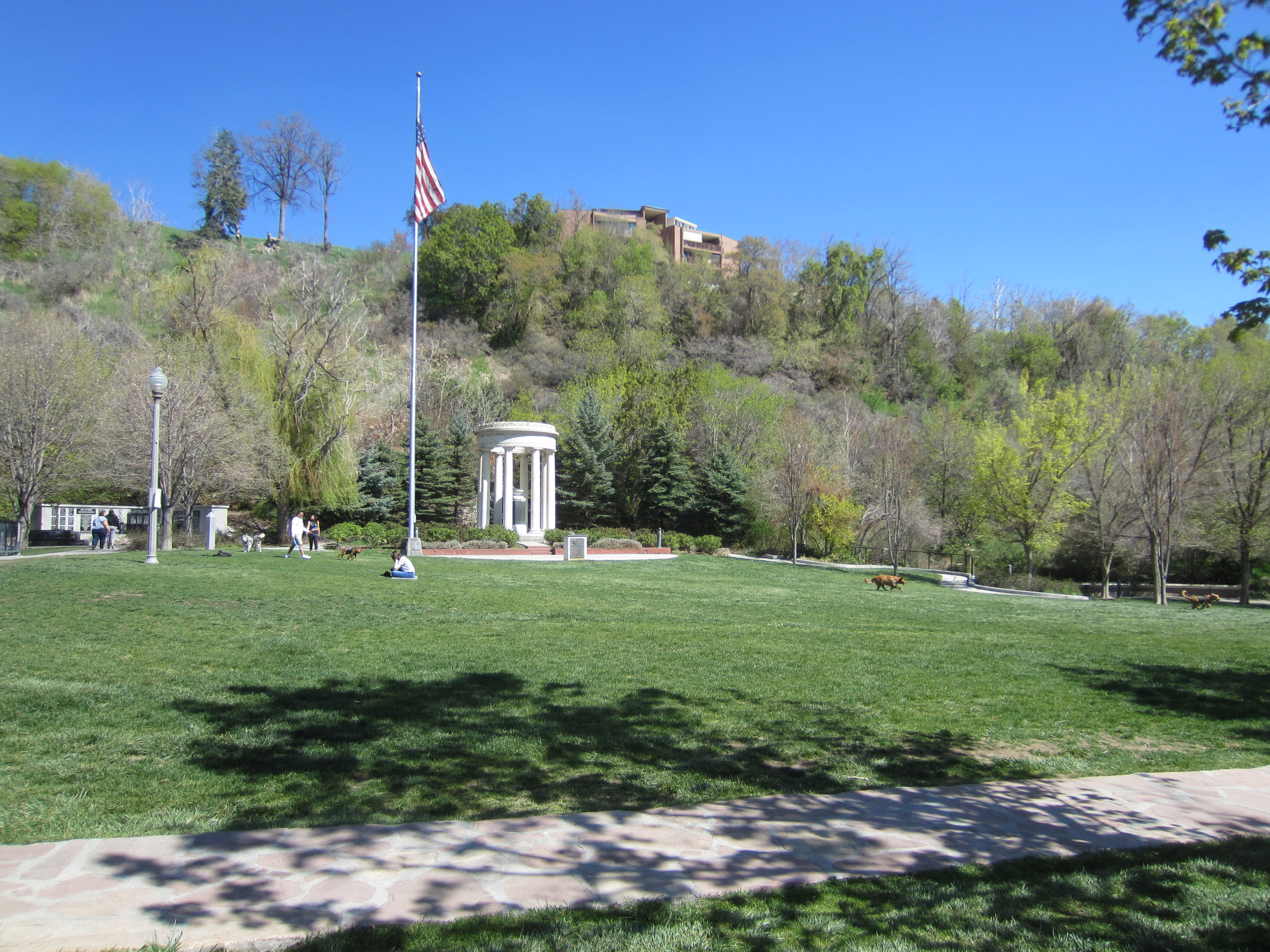
- Part of the park, 2021

- Location within Utah
- Type: urban park war memorial
- Location: Salt Lake City, Utah, United States
- Coordinates: 40°46′39″N 111°53′4″W

Memory Grove, formerly known as Memory Park and sometimes called Memory Grove Park, is a park in Salt Lake City, Utah, United States. Established as a war memorial at the mouth of City Creek Canyon in 1924, the park "spawned a long tradition of support and involvement by private, civil, fraternal, military, and political organizations, and its evolution over the span of five generations reflects Utah's changing values along with her participation in world events", according to William G. Love of Utah Historical Quarterly.

== History ==
In 1920, the Utah chapter of the Service Star Legion formed the Memory Grove Committee, seeking to petition for 30 acres of land. The city granted the southernmost 20 acres. Volunteers, including student and Boy Scouts, cleared garbage, stones, and weeds, and by May 20 the committee had purchased 300 trees for planting. Ethel Howard was appointed chairperson in February 1924. Memory Grove opened as "a lasting memorial to the hero dead of Utah" on June 27, 1924.

A German cannon was installed by the Disabled American Veterans' Argonne Chapter #2 on November 1, 1926, and the 145th Field Artillery Monument was installed by the Utah National Guard in 1927. Also completed in 1927 were the Capitol Hill steps and the Kiwanis Club's City Creek Bridge. A pair of concrete and bronze columns were installed at the park's southern end on May 30, 1930. An original memorial plaque was replaced by a column and pergola in 1932. Gold Star Hill was dedicated in 1934.

Following World War II, Ross and Elvera Beason funded another war memorial. The memorial's centerpiece was Meditation Chapel, which was completed in 1948 and dedicated on July 25. Approximately 10,000 people attended the ceremony, marking Memory Grove's most attended event to date, as of 2008. The dedication was broadcast by local radio stations, and Governor Herbert B. Maw and Mayor Earl J. Glade accepted the chapel on behalf of the state and city, respectively. Gold Star Mother Gunda Borgstrom was the first to enter the chapel.

Harbor Lake was dedicated by the Salt Lake City Navy Mother's Club on May 27, 1951, and the Veterans of Foreign Wars plaque was installed on November 11, 1963. Memory Park became known as Memory Grove Park, or simply Memory Grove, during the late 1960s and early 1970s. Some of the park's features were starting to deteriorate, including Memorial House; additionally, Harbor Lake was polluted and Meditation Chapel was locked because of vandalism. A weapons carrier commemorating Vietnam War veterans was dedicated on November 11, 1975.

In 1975, the Utah American Revolution Bicentennial Commission’s Horizon Committee selected Memory Grove as a primary site for the state's Bicentennial celebrations. On September 21, a park cleanup effort called "Sunday in the Grove" was held. One Bicentennial project was Perception Garden, conceived by Genevieve Folsom, garden editor for the Salt Lake Tribune. Another was a fountain paid for by Louis Zucker in memory of his wife Ethel Kaplan Zucker. Aluminum plaques were installed for both projects. The Liberty Bell replica and tower were dedicated in May 1979. Additionally, Celebrity Grove and the Grove of Service were planned as part of the Bicentennial celebration and were completed in 1979. Bureaucracy and design issues slowed construction of the fountain and garden, which were not finished until October 1981.

The trees of Celebrity Grove had died within two years of being planted. The park flooded in 1983. The Freedom Trail hiking path was dedicated in 1984, and the Pearl Harbor Survivors Association installed a memorial in 1985. The Service Star Legion left Memorial House in 1986, and after remaining closed for several years, the Utah Heritage Foundation began occupying the building in 1993.

== Features ==
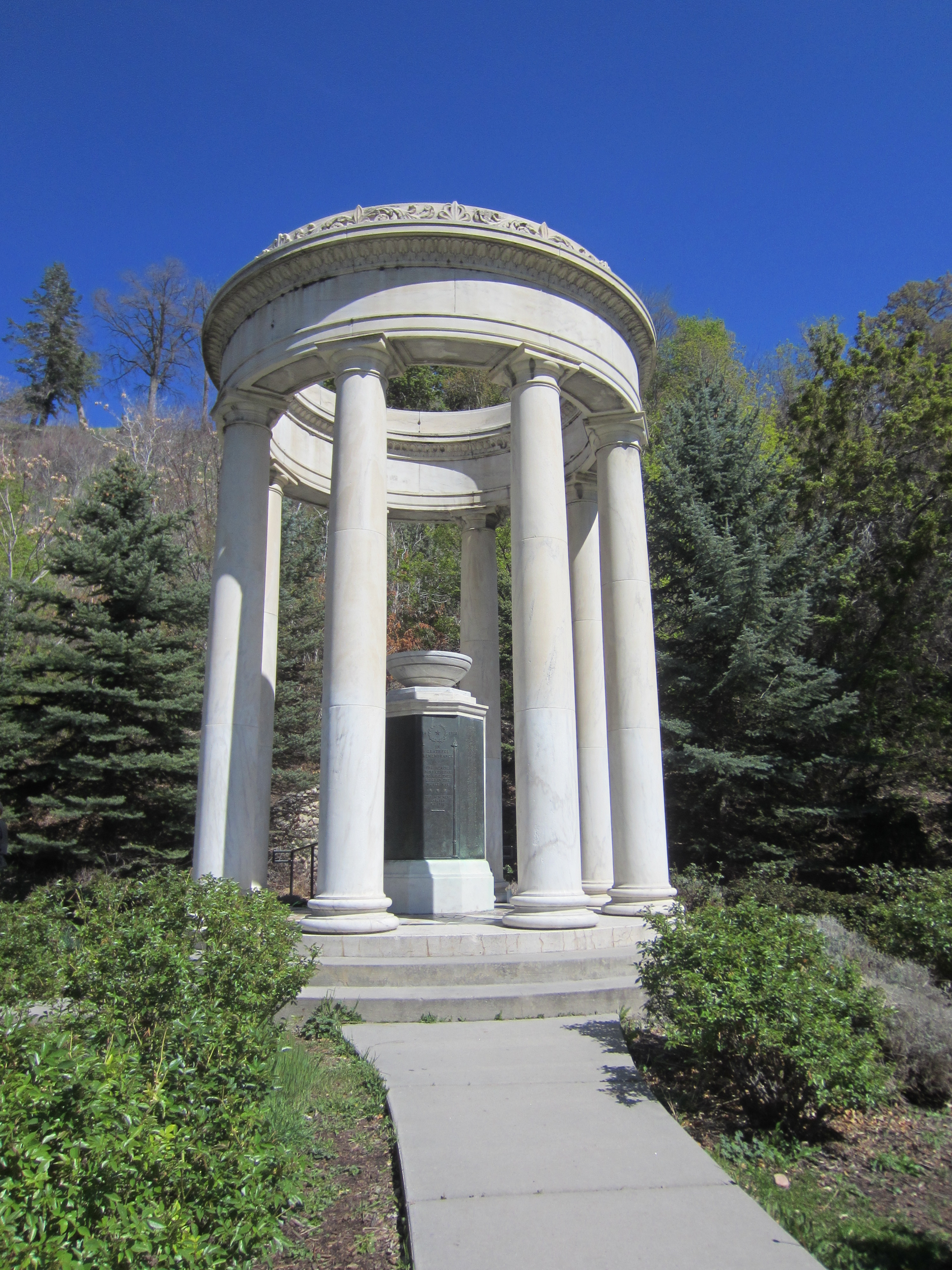
Pagoda memorial for Utahn soldiers killed in World War I

Features include:

- 145th Field Artillery Monument
- Harbor of Beauty
- Korean War Wall of Honor
- Liberty Bell replica
- Meditation Chapel
- Memorial House, a former stable rededicated as a meeting and event space on June 13, 1926
- Pagoda (World War I Memorial)
- stone footbridge
- Zucker Fountain
