= Glendale, Salt Lake City =

Neighborhood on the West side of Salt Lake City, Utah

Glendale
- Neighborhood of Salt Lake City
- Interactive map of Glendale
- Country: United States
- State: Utah
- City: Salt Lake City

Area
  - Total: 13.36 sq mi (34.6 km^{2})

Population (2020)
  - Total: 10,807
  - Density: 808.9/sq mi (312.3/km^{2})

Ethnicity
  - Hispanic: 45.2%
  - White: 29.5%
  - Pacific Islander: 9.2%
  - Asian: 6.2%
  - Black: 5.2%
  - Native American: 1.2%
  - Two or more: 3.1%

Economics
  - Median income: $77,275
- ZIP Codes: 84104, 84119
- Area code: 801, 385

Glendale is a neighborhood on the West side of Salt Lake City, Utah. Glendale is South of the Rose Park, Fair Park, and Poplar Grove neighborhoods. The neighborhood was originally developed as Glendale Gardens.

== Boundaries ==
The Glendale neighborhood is the area west of Interstate 15 to the western Salt Lake City boundary. Glendale's southern edge borders the City of South Salt Lake at SR-201 and extends North to approximately 950 S. North of Glendale is Poplar Grove. Both neighborhoods make up most of zip code 84104 and are within Salt Lake City Council District 2.

== Development ==
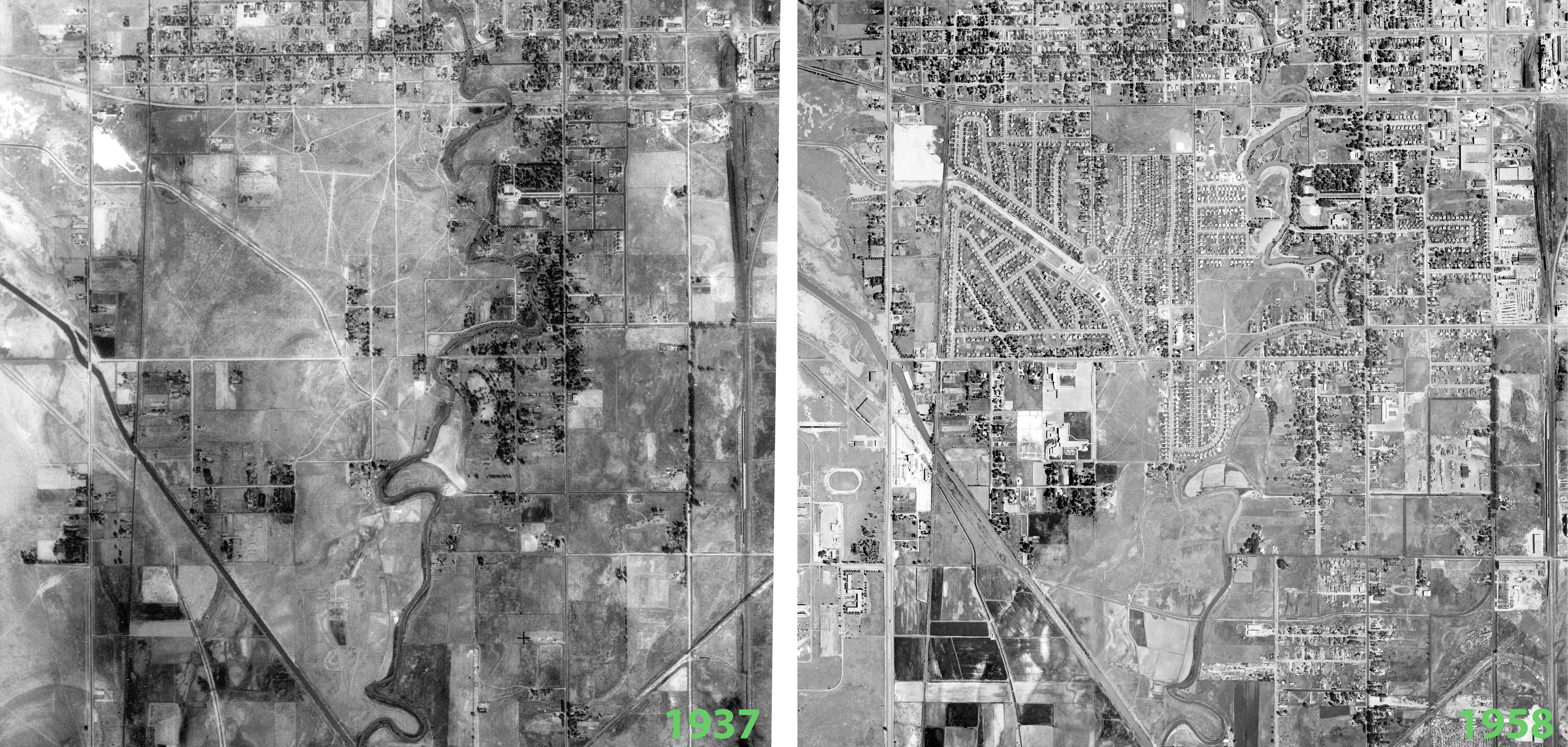
Historical aerial photographs of the Glendale neighborhood from 1937 (left) and 1958 (right), showing the level of development from 1937 to 1958.

=== Historical Development ===
==== Prior to 1930 ====
Some of the first homesteaders to settle in what is now the Glendale neighborhood were the George Q. Cannon family. The George Q. and Caroline Cannon House is a Victorian-style brick house at 1354 South and 1000 West and was built in 1876. There are maps, photography, property descriptions, and paintings documenting the development of this area. On May 31, 1896, the Latter-day Saint Cannon Ward was established by members of the Cannon family, serving the area between 600 West to the east, Redwood Road to the west, Indiana Avenue to the north, and 2700 South to the south. As of December 31, 1900, the Cannon Ward contained 61 families consisting of 331 people, 81 of which were children.

In the 1890s, several industries were established near the northeast corner of what is now Glendale (950 S and 600 W), including a brickyard, brewery, biscuit factory, salt works, and soup factory. In the early 20th century, railroad tracks bisected Salt Lake City. Industry and rail works isolated residential areas of the west side of Salt Lake City. The isolation and proximity to industry caused the residential areas to become working-class neighborhoods. Before the 1930s, Salt Lake City was highly polluted, having hazy air, and the Jordan River was used as a sewage disposal canal, making it a less desirable place to live near.

There are several houses on the east side of the Jordan River on present day California Avenue that were built prior to 1930.

==== Between 1930 and 1960 ====
Based on aerial photography, a significant amount of residential development occurred in the Glendale neighborhood from 1937 to 1958, which is coincident with the post-World War II expansion. The first major subdivisions built in Glendale were built in the 1940s and early 1950s. The early subdivisions were part of the Glendale Gardens housing project, built to accommodate a large influx of families moving to Utah for the war effort, associated with the relocation of the Ninth Service Command to Fort Douglas, Utah.

The area south of California Avenue, east of 1200 West, and west of the Jordan River, was developed from 1947 to 1952. The area north of California Avenue and south of Glendale Drive was also developed at this time.

The main development in the western, industrial part of Glendale was the Utah Ordnance Plant. This area was operated by the Remington Corporation. In 1941, several buildings were constructed within the Utah Ordnance Plant area for the purpose of producing World War II ammunition. The Utah Ordnance Plant was in operation from 1942 to 1943 and was in standby from 1944 to 1946. The area was decommissioned and sold after 1946.

==== Post 1960 ====
The Glendale area continued to develop to its present status. Most of the present apartment complexes were built during this time . Salt Lake County worked with the Utah Division of Parks to establish the Jordan River Parkway during this time.

=== Level of Development as of 2012 ===
Of the 7601 acres of zoned land within Glendale's boundaries, 7.5% (571 acres) is commercial, 56.7% (4309 acres) is manufacturing/industrial, 28.8% (2189 acres) is special purpose (open space, public land, and agriculture), and 7% (532 acres) is residential. As of 2010, Glendale has a population of 9962 people living in 2751 houses.

=== Post-2012 Development ===
The preliminary West Salt Lake City master plan outlines many improvements for the west side of Salt Lake City, including improvements to the area's entrances, upholding property maintenance standards, improving bicycle access, and improving the appearance of roads in the neighborhoods. Bordering the north extent of the Glendale neighborhood, the 9 Line Trail is a new trail network connecting West Salt Lake City to the rest of the city.

== Neighborhood ==
Those who live in Glendale cite it as affordable, and conveniently close to local schools, parks, the airport, and downtown Salt Lake City.

There are more than 25 different languages spoken in Glendale.

=== Schools ===
- Glendale Middle School
- Mountain View Elementary School (originally named Glendale Elementary)
- Dual Immersion Academy
- Parkview Elementary School
- Riley Elementary School (closed in 2024)

Most students are bussed to East High School for 9th-12th grade.

=== Parks ===
Glendale has 10 parks, totaling about 88 acres:

- 17th South River Park
- Bend-In-The-River
- Glendale Circle
- Glendale Park
- International Peace Gardens
- Jordan Park
- Jordan River Parkway
- Modesto Park
- Nelli Jack Park
- Weseman Park

Most of Glendale's parks, with the exceptions of Glendale Circle and Nelli Jack parks, are adjacent to the Jordan River. The International Peace Gardens park was conceived in 1939, dedicated in 1952, and has areas dedicated to 27 different countries. Jordan Park is West Salt Lake's largest park and hosts the weekly People's Market. The Jordan River Parkway connects several west Salt Lake City neighborhoods. Glendale also has an 18-hole municipal golf course.

=== Other Attractions ===
Glendale is home of Sorenson Unity Center, which hosts art exhibits, cultural events, film, and other events. The center also houses a fitness center for community members. The center also has computer center, a robotics club, a music studio for teens, and a number of other youth programs. The center also hosts the Unity Gardens, a community garden space.

== Crime ==
Based on data from February 1 to August 1, 2012, crime in Glendale is comparable to crime in Rose Park, Poplar Grove, and Liberty Wells neighborhoods, and is significantly lower than crime in the Downtown neighborhood. Glendale is also home to a Tongan Crip Gang set.
