= The Avenues, Salt Lake City =

Neighborhood in Salt Lake City, Utah, U.S.

The Avenues
- Neighborhood of Salt Lake City
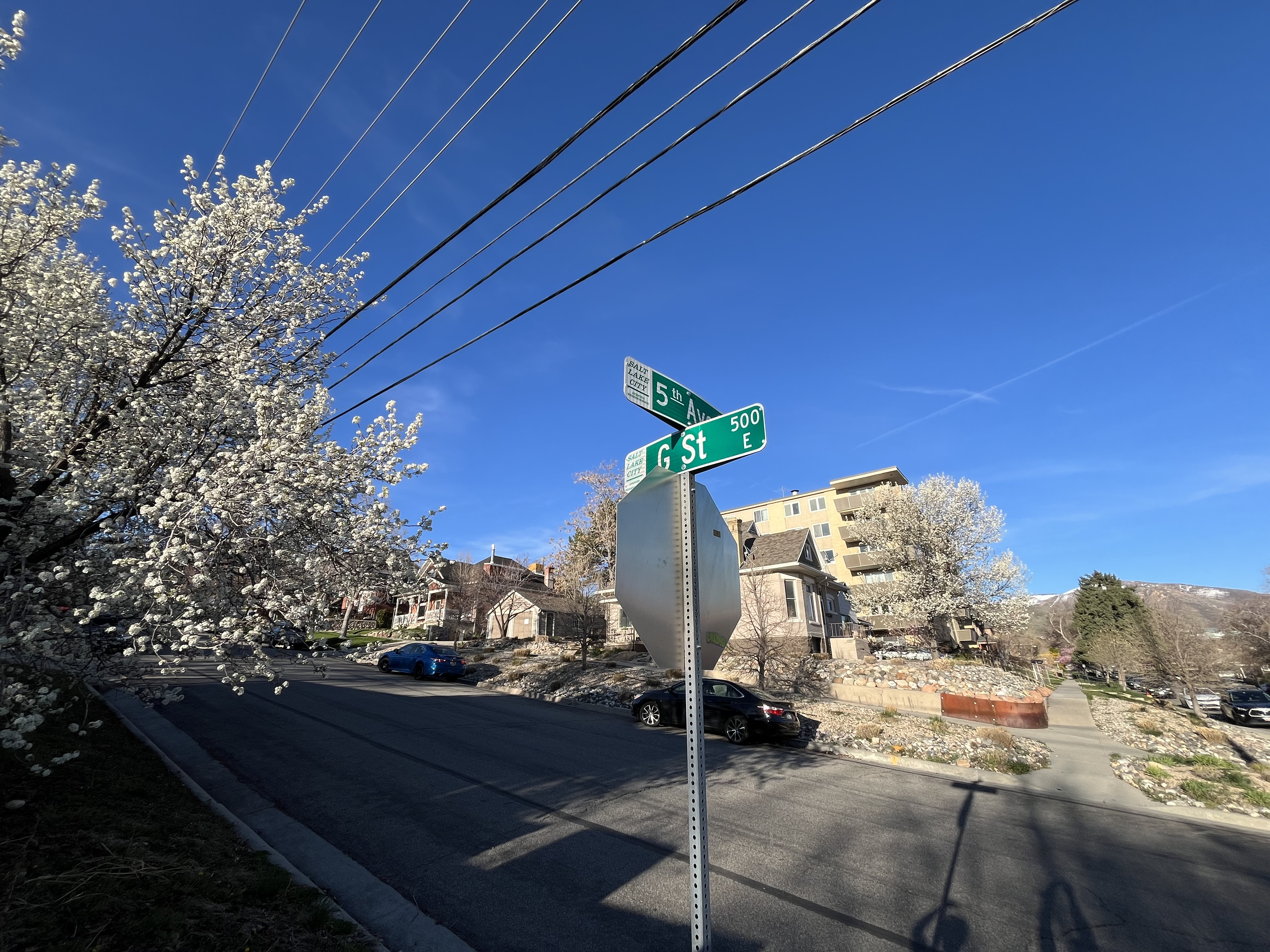
- Cross signs for 5th and G St. in the Avenues neighborhood of SLC.
- Interactive map of The Avenues
- Coordinates: 40°46′47″N 111°52′07″W
- Country: United States
- State: Utah
- City: Salt Lake City

Area
  - Total: 11.500 sq mi (29.78 km^{2})

Population (2020)
  - Total: 16,378
  - Density: 1,424.2/sq mi (549.88/km^{2})

Ethnicity (2020)
  - White: 79.8%
  - Hispanic: 7.2%
  - Asian: 4.2%
  - Black: 1.1%
  - Pacific Islander: 0.5%
  - Native American: 0.3%
  - Two or more: 4.8%

Economics (2020)
  - Median income: $103,475
- ZIP Codes: 84102, 84103, 84111
- Area code: 801, 385

The Avenues is a neighborhood in Salt Lake City, Utah, located northeast of downtown on the lower slopes of the Wasatch Mountains. Its street layout consists largely of numbered east–west avenues and lettered north–south streets. The first lots were surveyed in the early 1850s, and the area was the first section of Salt Lake City to depart from the city's original ten-acre block grid, using smaller blocks and narrower streets.

The Avenues developed as a residential neighborhood during the late 19th and early 20th centuries, with settlement encouraged by horse-drawn and later electric trolley service. By the turn of the 20th century, it was predominantly a middle- and upper-middle-class suburb. After a period of decline by the 1960s, residents organized the Greater Avenues Community Council to promote revitalization.

Part of the neighborhood is included in the Avenues Historic District, a 487-acre (197 ha) historic district listed on the National Register of Historic Places in 1980. The district contains 143 contributing buildings and one contributing site, Brigham Young's Grave.

== Layout and geography ==
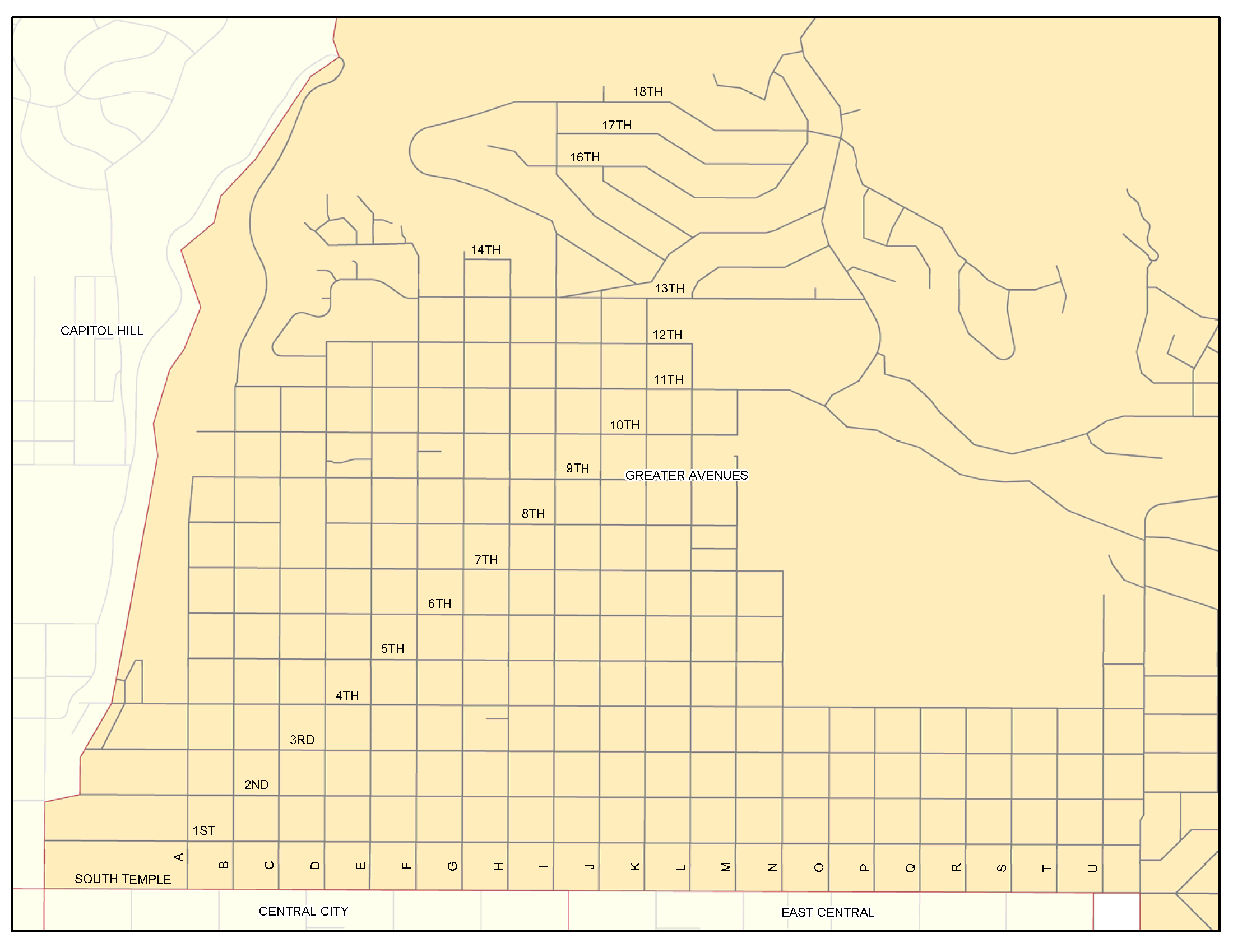
Map of the Avenues.

The Avenues neighborhood lies on the "north east bench" of the Wasatch Mountains in Salt Lake City. The southern boundary of the Avenues is South Temple Street (1st Avenue is the next street north). Heading north, the Avenues neighborhood is built up onto the lower slopes of the mountains.

The north–south roads in the Avenues, which slope up the hillside, begin at Canyon Road and then are lettered from "A" to "U" Street and then "Virginia Street", from west to east. The fairly level east–west roads are numbered 1st to 18th Avenues heading northward from South Temple Street. The rigid grid system breaks down around 13th Avenue, as more recent developments farther north have taken a more serpentine bend. The 'major' streets used more for through-traffic, particularly for their connections at South Temple Street to city arteries, are B, E, I, and Virginia; the 'major' avenues are 2nd, 3rd, 6th, 11th, and 13th.

The Avenues lie just northeast of downtown Salt Lake City and just east—over City Creek Canyon—from Capitol Hill. The neighborhood to the east of the lower (below 11th) Avenues, known as Federal Heights, is traditionally thought of as beginning north of South Temple Street and East of Virginia Street. While physically part of the Avenues, the Federal Heights neighborhood may be considered as generally more affluent than the Avenues, with larger, more stately homes. To the north of Federal Heights is a more recently developed area called Arlington Hills. Compared to the neighborhoods to the east, the Avenues are in places quite steep as they climb the foothills to the north.

The large Salt Lake City Cemetery occupies a significant portion of the eastern Avenues below 11th Avenue and abuts Lindsey Gardens (park). To the north of 11th Avenue is the 11th Avenue Park, west of Terrace Hills, a major north–south street leading into the upper Avenues.

The "lower Avenues" (below 11th or 13th) is a neighborhood of mostly older Victorian-era houses, at one time popular with younger homeowners looking for affordable "fixer-uppers". In recent years a large renovation boom has swept the area. As fixer-uppers are diminishing, it has become less affordable to the younger crowd. There are numerous apartment buildings dotting the lower Avenues also. The Avenues is also especially popular due to its proximity to downtown, the large and remote Memory Grove/City Creek Canyon recreation area to the west, the University of Utah to the east/southeast, and the airport, as well as low traffic and minimal commercial development. The more significant non-residential developments are a supermarket with a few small shops and a State Liquor Store comprising the block between E and F Streets and 5th and 6th Avenue, a few small businesses throughout the Avenues, and the LDS Hospital complex comprising the blocks of 7th Avenue to 9th Avenue between C and D Streets, with additional doctors offices between 9th and 10th Avenue between C and D Streets. Shriners Hospital for Children is located on the east side of Virginia Street bordering 11th Avenue. Popperton Park is at the northeast corner of Virginia and 11th Avenue. A small city library branch is at 9th Avenue and F Street. There are several schools and churches within the Avenues, as well as a large funeral home and mausoleum on the north side of 11th Avenue just west of Virginia street. The Ronald McDonald House is on the north side of South Temple between M and N Streets, where it will soon expand with buildings along the entire block facing South Temple. Other office buildings are found on the north side of South Temple between A Street and Virginia.

== History ==
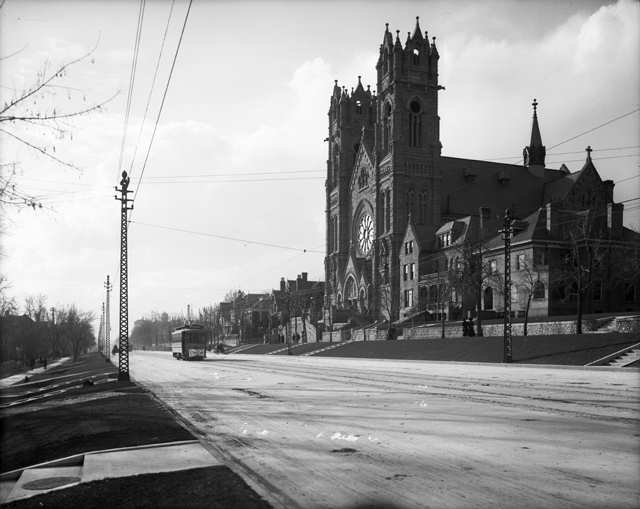
Cathedral of the Madeleine on the perimeter of the Avenues in 1908. Note electric trolley car

The Avenues was the first section of Salt Lake City to deviate from the original ten acre (40,000 m^{2}) block grid pattern. Blocks were one half the dimension of the original grid, making them 2.5 acres (10,000 m^{2}). Streets and sidewalks were narrower too, meaning that the Avenues' streets match poorly to the original blocks at the base of the neighborhood along South Temple Street. The first lots were surveyed in the early 1850s, but the Avenues' deviant platting violated the law. The territorial legislature had to pass a new survey ordinance for the Avenues, which they did in 1860.

Originally, all of the streets were named. North–south streets were named for trees, and east–west streets had names like "Fruit", "Garden", "Bluff", and "Wall" (for what are now 2nd through 5th avenue respectively). By 1885 the north–south streets gained their current alphabetical designations (A Street through V Street, although V was turned into Virginia Street). However, the east–west streets were still known as Streets. They were not retitled into Avenues until 1907. Up until that time, the area was known as "the dry bench" because it lacked water.

Until 1884, residents in the northeastern Avenues had to haul water for everyday use. Protests prompted the city to install pipelines along 6th Avenue, but those living in the higher Avenues would be without water until 1908.

In spite of water problems, the Avenues proved to be an attractive residential neighborhood. In the southwest Avenues, artisans could live very close to downtown. In the east Avenues, "Butcherville" sprang up after slaughterhouses relocated to the east side in 1860.

Transportation was a major draw for settlement in the Avenues. The Salt Lake Railway Company offered mule and horse-drawn trolley rides in the Avenues by 1872, and the trolleys became electric in 1889. Salt Lake Rapid Transit Company incorporated in 1890 and the companies competed fiercely until merging in 1903. The trolley system expanded to other parts of the city as the Utah Light and Traction Company, but rail lines were denser in the Avenues than any other part of the city save downtown. The tracks were removed in the 1940s after National City Lines acquired (and dismantled) the trolley lines.

At the turn of the century, the neighborhood was a predominantly middle- and upper-middle class trolley suburb, home to many professionals. Developers, including future president of the Church of Jesus Christ of Latter-day Saints (LDS Church) Heber J. Grant, promoted Avenues home ownership.

The old Primary Children's Hospital was located in the avenues. With the rise of other, more affluent neighborhoods like Federal Heights, the Avenues became less popular. By the 1960s, deterioration was evident as landlords often found it economically advantageous to let properties go neglected. Most homes, built between about 1880 and 1920, showed their age, and the community dealt with increasing problems with transients. In response to these problems, residents formed the Greater Avenues Community Council (GACC) to help revitalize and restore livability to the neighborhood. Today the neighborhood has been revitalized and is considered by many to be one of Salt Lake's most desirable neighborhoods.

== Avenues Historic District ==
- Avenues Historic District
- U.S. National Register of Historic Places
- U.S. Historic district
- Location within Utah Location within the United States
- Location: Roughly bounded by 1st and 9th Aves., State and Virginia Sts., Salt Lake City, Utah
- Area: 487 acres (197 ha)
- Built: 1850
- Architect: Multiple
- Architectural style: Mixed
- NRHP reference No.: 80003915
- Added to NRHP: August 27, 1980

The Avenues Historic District is a 487-acre (197 ha) historic district that was listed on the National Register of Historic Places in 1980. It included 143 contributing buildings and one contributing site, Brigham Young's Grave.

The Barlow House, a brick Queen Anne style house in the district, has a twin that was built out in a rural area, the Amanda Conk Best House in Millcreek, Utah, also NRHP-listed.

Also the Arthur O. Clark House at 1059 East 3rd Avenue, built in 1895, is a mirror copy of the Oscar M. Booth House, built in 1893 in Nephi, Utah by carpenter Oscar M. Booth.

== See also ==
- National Register of Historic Places listings in Salt Lake City
- List of Salt Lake City neighborhoods
