= Salt Lake City School District =

Public school district in Utah, United States

Address
- 406 East 100 South Salt Lake City, Utah, 84111; United States
- Coordinates: 40°46′00″N 111°52′45″W

District information
- Type: Public
- Grades: PK–12
- Schools: 36
- NCES District ID: 4900870

Students and staff
- Students: 19,049 (2025–2026)
- Teachers: 1,044.35 (on an FTE basis) (2025–2026)
- Staff: 1,490.67 (on an FTE basis) (2025–2026)
- Student–teacher ratio: 18.24 (2025–2026)

Other information
- Website: www.slcschools.org

The Salt Lake City School District (SLCSD) is the oldest public school district in Utah. Boundaries for the district are identical to the city limits for Salt Lake City. Employing about 1,300 teachers who instruct about 25,000 students K-12, the district is the ninth largest in the state, as of 2009, behind Granite, Davis, Alpine, Jordan, Canyons, Weber, Nebo, and Washington. Two of the district's high schools, East and West, are over 100 years old.

== High schools ==
All high schools in the Salt Lake City District serve grades 9-12. The district operates three high schools: East High School near the University of Utah serving the southwest and central-east part of the city, West High School in western downtown serving the north and west area, and Highland High School near Sugar House Park serving the southeast. Additionally, the district runs an alternative/adult education school, Horizonte High School, located on Main Street in the south central city, and the new Innovations Early College High School, a "student centered, personalized education" school that will focus on learning through digital technology, located in the south-central part of the city attached to Salt Lake Community College South City campus.

A high school no longer extant, South High School, located at State St. and 1700 South, once served the southern part of Salt Lake City. The district built this school during the Great Depression to accommodate about 1000 students from the private LDS High School, which closed in 1931. South High was located in some of the poorer areas of Salt Lake City with a population increasingly devoid of school age children by the 1980s. Falling enrollment throughout the school district prompted the district to close the fledgling South High in 1988. Schools with older facilities, such as East and West, as well as Highland High School received students from portions of the former South High school boundaries. The district donated the South High School school building to the Salt Lake Community College, where it currently serves as its South City campus.

=== East High School ===
East High School serves grades nine through twelve. East High School was founded in 1914 and currently has an enrolled student body of 2,109. It is located at 840 S 1300 E in Salt Lake City's East Bench. The current principal is Ryan Oaks. The school mascot is the leopard, and the school colors are red and white.

=== Highland High School ===
Highland High School opened in 1956 and has a student body of about 1,546. It is located at 2166 South 1700 East, next to Sugar House Park. The current principal is Jeremy Chatterton. The school mascot is the ram, and the school colors are black and white. Highland also has a long-standing rivalry with East High School.

=== West High School ===
West High School is located at 241 North 300 West in Salt Lake City. Founded in 1890 as Salt Lake High School, West High is the oldest high school in the Salt Lake School District and the second oldest in Utah. It is the highest-ranked high school in Utah according to Newsweek. West High has a student population of 2,559 under principal Ford White. In addition to students in grades nine through twelve, West High School serves a group of 7th and 8th graders in an Extended Learning Program (ELP). The school mascot is the panther, and the school colors are red and black.

== Middle schools ==
There are five middle schools in the Salt Lake City School District. All middle schools in the district teach grades 7-8, except Glendale which teaches 6-8.

Salt Lake City middle schools
| School | Enrollment | Neighborhood |
| Bryant Middle School | 540 | Central City |
| Clayton Middle School | 610 | East Bench |
| Glendale Middle School | 786 | Glendale |
| Hillside Middle School | 519 | Sugar House |
| Northwest Middle School | 787 | Rose Park |

In addition, West High School offers grade 7 and 8 for some students as part of the "Extended Learning Program" (ELP).

== K-8 schools ==
Salt Lake City middle schools
| School | Enrollment | Neighborhood |
| Nibley Park School | 474 | Sugar House |

== Elementary schools ==
The district operates 23 elementary schools. Almost all elementary schools in the district serve grades K-6. Edison, Parkview, and Mountain View serve grades K-5 (these 6th graders attend Glendale Middle). Most elementary schools offer preschool services.

Salt Lake City elementary schools
| School | Enrollment | Neighborhood |
| Backman Elementary School | 604 | Rose Park |
| Beacon Heights Elementary School | 486 | East Bench |
| Bonneville Elementary School | 523 | East Bench |
| Dilworth Elementary School | 581 | Sugar House |
| Edison Elementary School | 579 | Poplar Grove |
| Emerson Elementary School | 530 | East Central |
| Ensign Elementary School | 362 | The Avenues |
| Escalante Elementary School | 575 | Westpointe |
| Franklin Elementary School | 430 | Poplar Grove |
| Highland Park Elementary School | 596 | Sugar House |
| Indian Hills Elementary School | 430 | East Bench |
| Liberty Elementary School | 535 | Central City |
| Meadowlark Elementary School | 554 | Jordan Meadows |
| Mountain View Elementary School | 596 | Glendale |
| Newman Elementary School | 478 | Rose Park |
| North Star Elementary School | 687 | Westpointe |
| Parkview Elementary School | 429 | Glendale |
| Rose Park Elementary School | 488 | Rose Park |
| Uintah Elementary School | 542 | East Bench |
| Wasatch Elementary School | 471 | The Avenues |
| Washington Elementary School | 333 | Capitol Hill |
| Whittier Elementary School | 674 | Liberty Wells |

In 1999, the district approved a bond that would reconstruct 20 of the elementary schools as well as Northwest Middle School. In addition, two elementary schools were closed for the 2002–2003 school season (Rosslyn Heights in Sugar House and Lowell in The Avenues) while serving as temporary campuses for the reconstructed schools. They were originally going to choose two schools off of a list of eight to be closed, and eventually the school board decided to close Lowell and Rosslyn Heights (the latter of which was not on the list). This aroused considerable protest from parents, teachers, and even board members, and lawsuits were filed against the district. However, they failed to keep the schools open.

In 2024, the district voted to close down four more elementary schools due to lower enrollment and aging conditions of the buildings: Hawthorne Elementary (Liberty Wells), Mary W. Jackson Elementary (Fairpark), Riley Elementary (Glendale), and M. Lynn Bennion Elementary (Central City). This stirred up controversy, as all four schools were in walkable neighborhoods. Additionally, the latter three elementary schools all received Title I funding. However, despite considerable parent protests and community action, the schools closed starting in the 2024-2025 school year. Boundaries were adjusted and students were moved to nearby schools, with minimal bussing adjustments. The Spanish Dual Language Immersion program, which had previously been housed at Mary W. Jackson Elementary, moved to Newman Elementary.

== Charter schools ==
Public charter schools in the district include Open Classroom, an elementary and middle school that has been part of the district since 1977 and is currently housed in the building that once was Lowell Elementary; Open High School of Utah, established in 2009; and the Salt Lake Center for Science Education, established in 2008.
