= Salt Lake City Public Library =

Public library in Utah, United States

Coordinates: 40.7597°N 111.8839°W

- Location: Salt Lake City, Utah, U.S.
- Established: 1964

Other information
- Website: services.slcpl.org

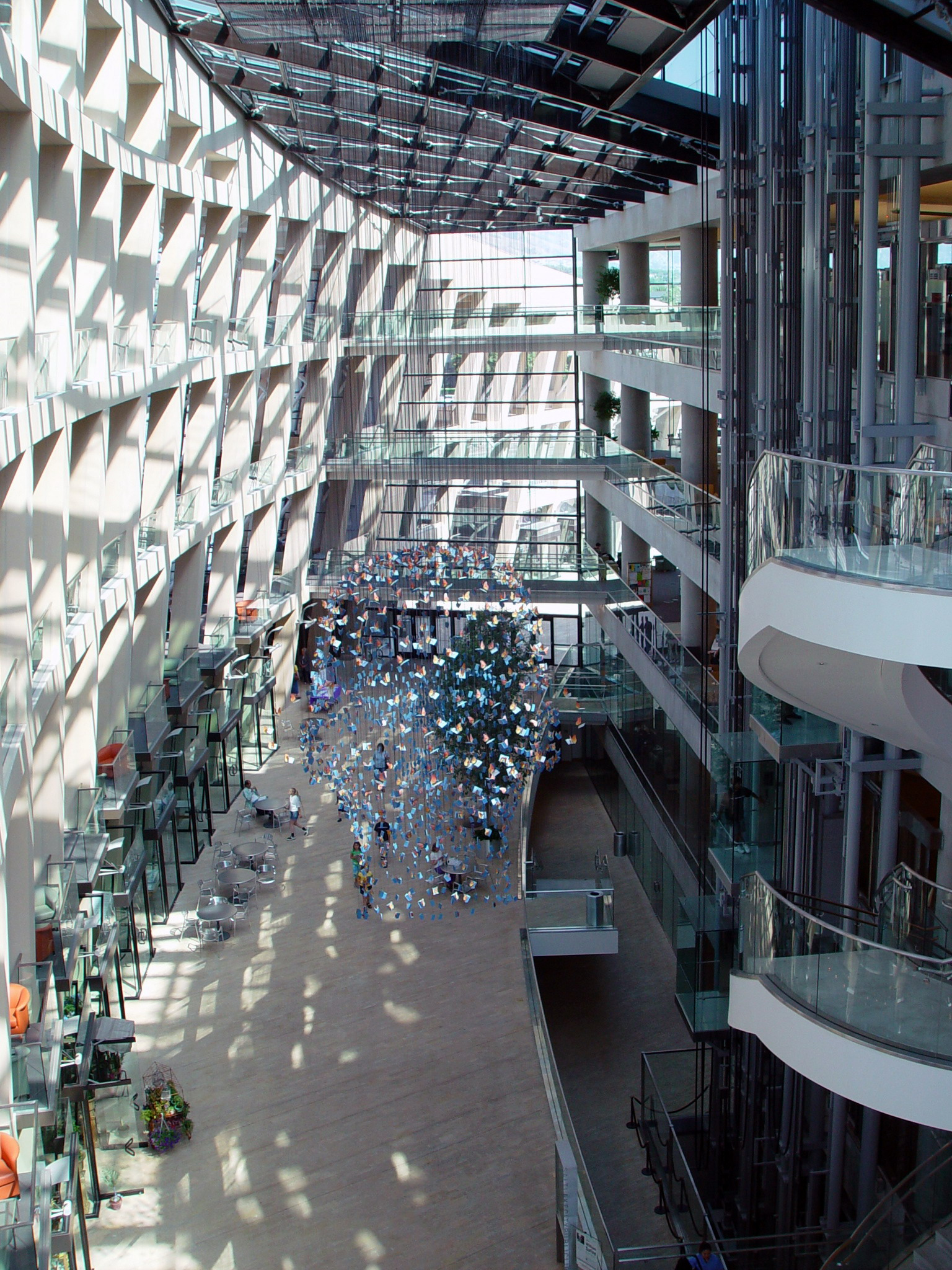
Interior view of the "Urban Room"

The Salt Lake City Public Library system's main branch building is an architecturally unique structure in Salt Lake City, Utah. It is located at 210 East 400 South, across from the Salt Lake City and County Building and Washington Square.

== History ==
The Salt Lake City Public Library was originally housed in the Salt Lake City and County Building in 1898. Thanks to a donation of land and money by a John Quackenbos Packard in 1900, a new library was built in downtown Salt Lake City; the building is now listed on the National Register of Historic Places. This building remained in use until the library outgrew it by the early 1960s. The city library was then moved to a new home across from the City and County Building at the intersection of 500 South and 200 East. The groundbreaking ceremony was held on December 28, 1962, and the building was dedicated on October 30, 1964. In 1965, the old library was renovated into the Hansen Planetarium, funded by a donation of $400,000 from Beatrice M. Hansen.

=== 1994 hostage incident ===
On March 7, 1994, a gunman took several hostages in a conference room on the second floor of the old main branch building. The library was evacuated and SWAT teams were called in during a six-hour siege, which ended in the death of the gunman and the freeing of the hostages.

=== Move to the current location ===
After celebrating the library's 100th anniversary in early 1998, an $84 million library bond was approved to relocate the library in a new building, north half a block, to its current location. The firm Moshe Safdie and Associates partnered with a local architecture firm, VCBO Architecture, to design the building, which opened to the public on February 8, 2003. The former building in Library Square housed The Leonardo, a museum until 2025. It remains the home of Ken Sanders Rare Books.

On September 15, 2006, a small bomb exploded in the third floor of the main building. No one was hurt, and the damage sustained by the building was a broken window. Eastbound traffic on the streets of 400 South and 200 East was closed as 400 people were forced to evacuate.

=== Suicides and attempted suicides ===
There have been several public suicides at the library since its relocation. In April 2008, a woman jumped from the third floor balcony inside the library and died.

In July 2005, a woman jumped from the roof of the building to her death. In March 2011, a woman jumped from the fourth floor inside the building and died. In April 2012, a man jumped from the balcony inside the library to his death.

On June 10, 2013, at approximately 4pm, a 21-year-old man jumped to his death from the roof, prompting the closure of the library for the remainder of the day.

On November 13, 2013, at approximately 4:15pm, a 21-year-old man was witnessed jumping from the roof of the building. The man survived the fall and was taken to LDS Hospital for his injuries. The event prompted the closure of the library for the remainder of the day.

== Building ==
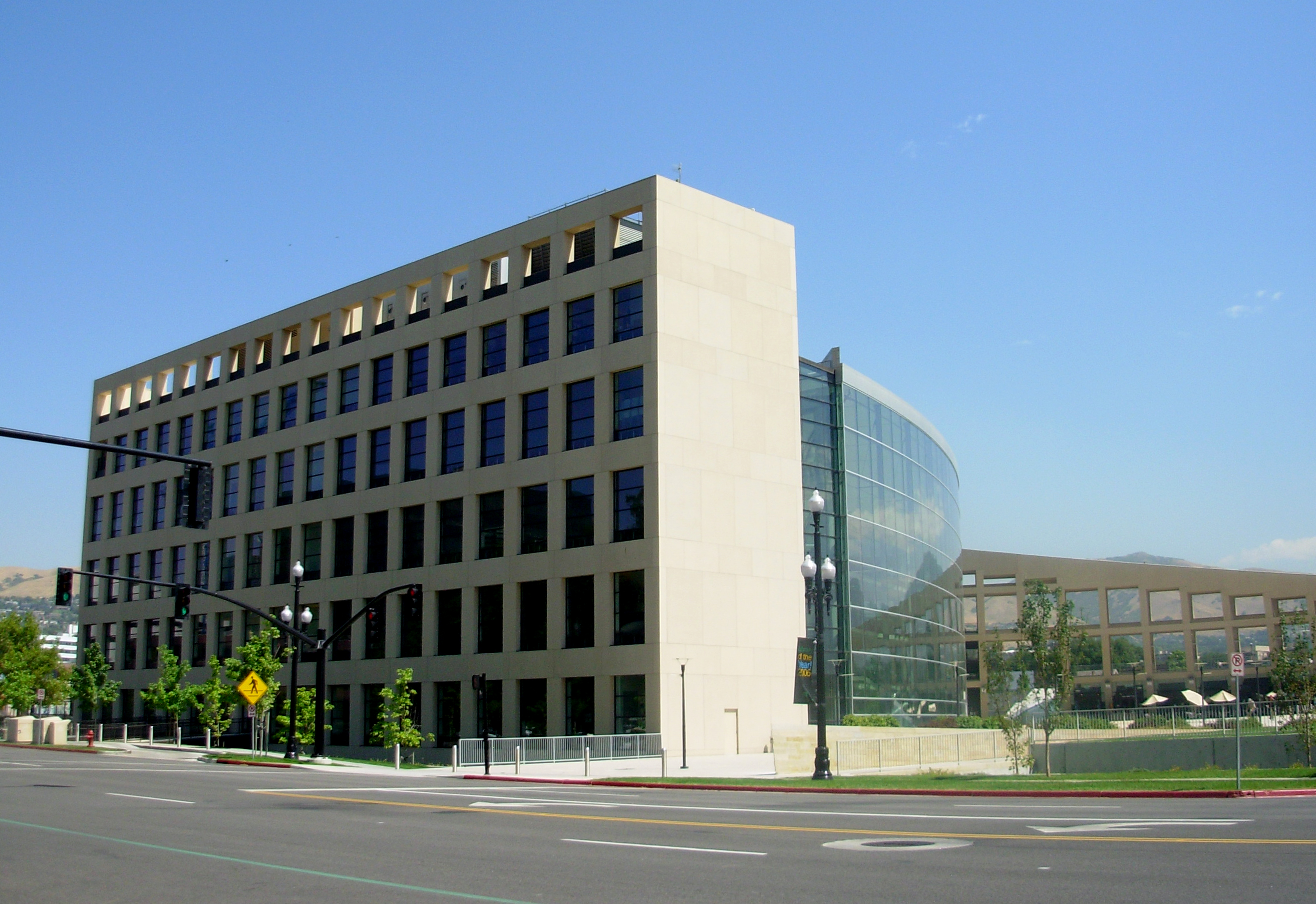
Exterior of the Salt Lake City Public Library's main branch building's west side, as seen from 200 East.

The Salt Lake City main library covers an area of 240,000 square feet (22,000 m^{2}) in a five-story tall, wedge-shaped building. The structure includes 44,960 cubic yards (34,370 m^{3}) of concrete, and 176,368 square feet (16,385.1 m^{2}) of glass, including a five-story curved glass outer wall. The Vancouver Public Library, also designed by Safdie, shares a similar design—most clearly apparent in the main foyer and the sweeping outer facade.

The building is housed within Library Square, a landscaped and paved plaza that encompasses the city block. Much of what is now landscaped, open space had been planned to be covered by outbuildings, but Rocky Anderson, Salt Lake City's mayor at the time of the library's opening, asked for these to be left out in favor of creating a public park. A later initiative to create a new headquarters for the Salt Lake City Police Department was also struck down and the building was subsequently placed a block east, directly across from library square. The square is also occupied by shops, a community writing center run by Salt Lake Community College, studios of radio station KUUB and, most notably, The Leonardo Museum, which is housed in the library's former building. The entrance to the building's interior leads to the "Urban Room", a foyer that contains more shops and extends upward for all five floors, ending with a 20,000 sq ft (1,900 m^{2}) skylight.

The building is topped by a garden on the roof planted with trees, grasses, flowering bulbs and various perennial plants, as well as tended beehives. In addition, there is a community garden outside of the library's ground floor and a "seed library" from which any patrons can receive seeds for their own gardening.

In 2006, the library received Library Journal's "Library of the Year" award, largely based on the significance of the building.

Other notable features of the building include:

- Fireplaces on four of the floors and were designed to resemble a column of fire when viewed from 200 East and 400 South.
- A "lens" on the south side of the building, which helps to warm the building during the winter, and saves on heating costs.
- A gallery displaying works of local artists.
- A coffee shop with a private staircase providing direct access to the "Teen Lounge," an area which contains the young adult section.
- A children's library that is visible from all floors and has special areas for children to read and for baby care.
- A spiral staircase and three glass elevators.
- The main building is shaped like a triangle or arrowhead and points directly at the Salt Lake Mormon Temple.

== Collection ==
The library's collection comprises over 500,000 books, subscriptions to over 60 newspapers and magazines, an expansive digital library with a variety of resources, 163 internet-capable computers.

The library also contains a publicly-accessible archive, with thousands of historic books, magazines, newspapers, microfilm, and zines. The oldest item in the collection is the North American Review from 1821.

A notable item in the archival collection is a 19th century edition of John James Audubon's Birds of America, which was purchased by the library in 1903. The copy is not an original print, rather, it is from a later run commissioned by Audubon's son John in the 1850s. Unlike the first run, the copy's illustrations are not hand-colored, but they are an early example of the then-revolutionary process of chromolithography.

== Union ==
In 2023, SLCPL launched a campaign to unionize under AFSCME Local 1004.. Following an election in 2025, the workers voted with 92% approval to became the first unionized library in the state of Utah.
