= 9th and 9th, Salt Lake City =

9th and 9th is a neighborhood in Salt Lake City, Utah located two blocks east of Liberty Park. The area gets its name from the intersection of 900 South and 900 East.

The neighborhood is known for its local shops, restaurants, cafes and other small businesses that lie along 900 South. It is a popular residential area for students and upper-income families due to its walkability, along with its proximity to Downtown and the University of Utah campus. It contains one of the private school campuses of Rowland Hall.

The neighborhood is host to the annual 9th and 9th Street Festival.

== 2007 Renovation ==
During the summer of 2007, 9th and 9th received sidewalk and street improvements. Kinetic sculpture art displays inspired by the nine Muses of Greek mythology were installed on all four corners of the intersection. The sculptures were created by Troy Pillow.

The building on the northwest corner has recently been remodeled.

== 9th and 9th Street Festival ==
The 9th and 9th Street Festival is an event held for neighbors and is run annually by a group of neighbor volunteers. The festival typically hosts 100–150 booths made up of artists and varied vendors each year, and runs in September.

== History ==
In the 1970s, a small number of shops moved into 9th and 9th. Mother’s Earth Things, Stone Balloon Waterbeds, Skin Company Productions, Desolation Row, Nature's Way, The Connection and Cosmic Aeroplane. The businesses fostered an alternative community that became the epicenter of the counterculture movement in Salt Lake City. They also proved to be the driving force that transformed the area into a vibrant and burgeoning neighborhood.

Mother's Earth Things- Founded by Linda Huntington and Tamara Buranek in 1970. Featured high-quality hand-crafted clothing, candles, tie-dye, and woven wall hangings.

Stone Balloon Waterbeds- Utah's oldest waterbed store. Founded by Bob Gaddie in 1971.

Skin Company Productions- Founded by Ken Rogers. Handcrafted leather clothing.

Desolation Row- A sandwich shop named after Bob Dylan's famous recording. Founded by singer Richard Cordray of Smoke Blues Band.

Nature's Way- A natural food store founded by Ed Hurd.

Cosmic Aeroplane- A record-and-book shop founded by Steve Jones.
