= Buildings and sites of Salt Lake City =

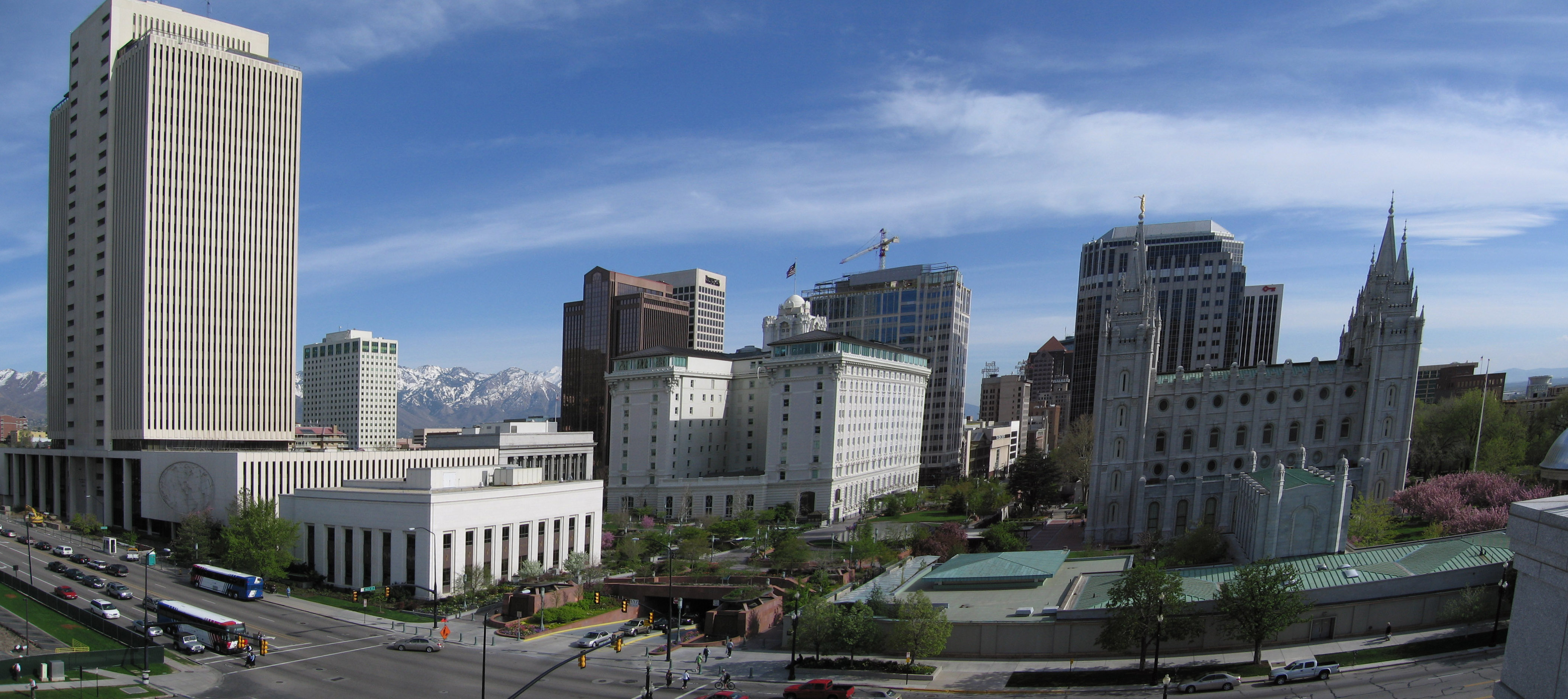
Central downtown Salt Lake City as viewed from the north facing south

Salt Lake City, Utah has many historic and notable sites within its immediate borders. Although the entire Salt Lake City metropolitan area is often referred to as "Salt Lake City", this article is concerned only with the buildings and sites within the official city limits of Salt Lake City.

== Neighborhoods and councils ==
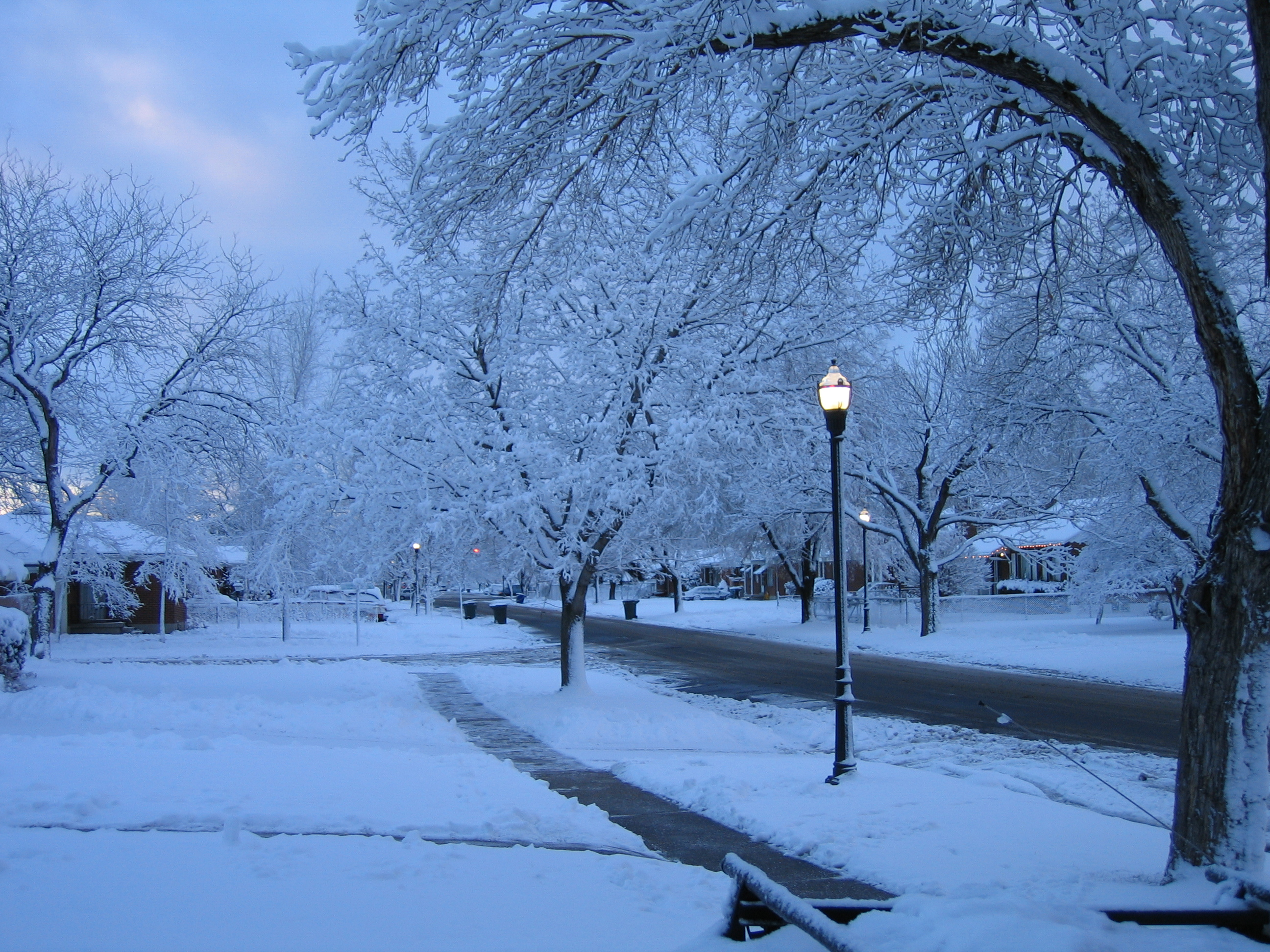
Rose Park during the winter

- The Avenues
- Bonneville Hills
- Capitol Hill
- Central City
- Downtown
- East Bench
- East Central
- Fairpark
- Federal Heights
- Foothill/Sunnyside
- Glendale
- Guadalupe
- Highland Park
- Jackson Square
- Jordan Meadows
- Liberty-Wells
- The Marmalade District
- People's Freeway
- Poplar Grove
- Rose Park
- Sugarhouse
- Sunnyside East
- University Park
- Wasatch Hollow
- Yalecrest
- Yuma View

== Parks and attractions ==
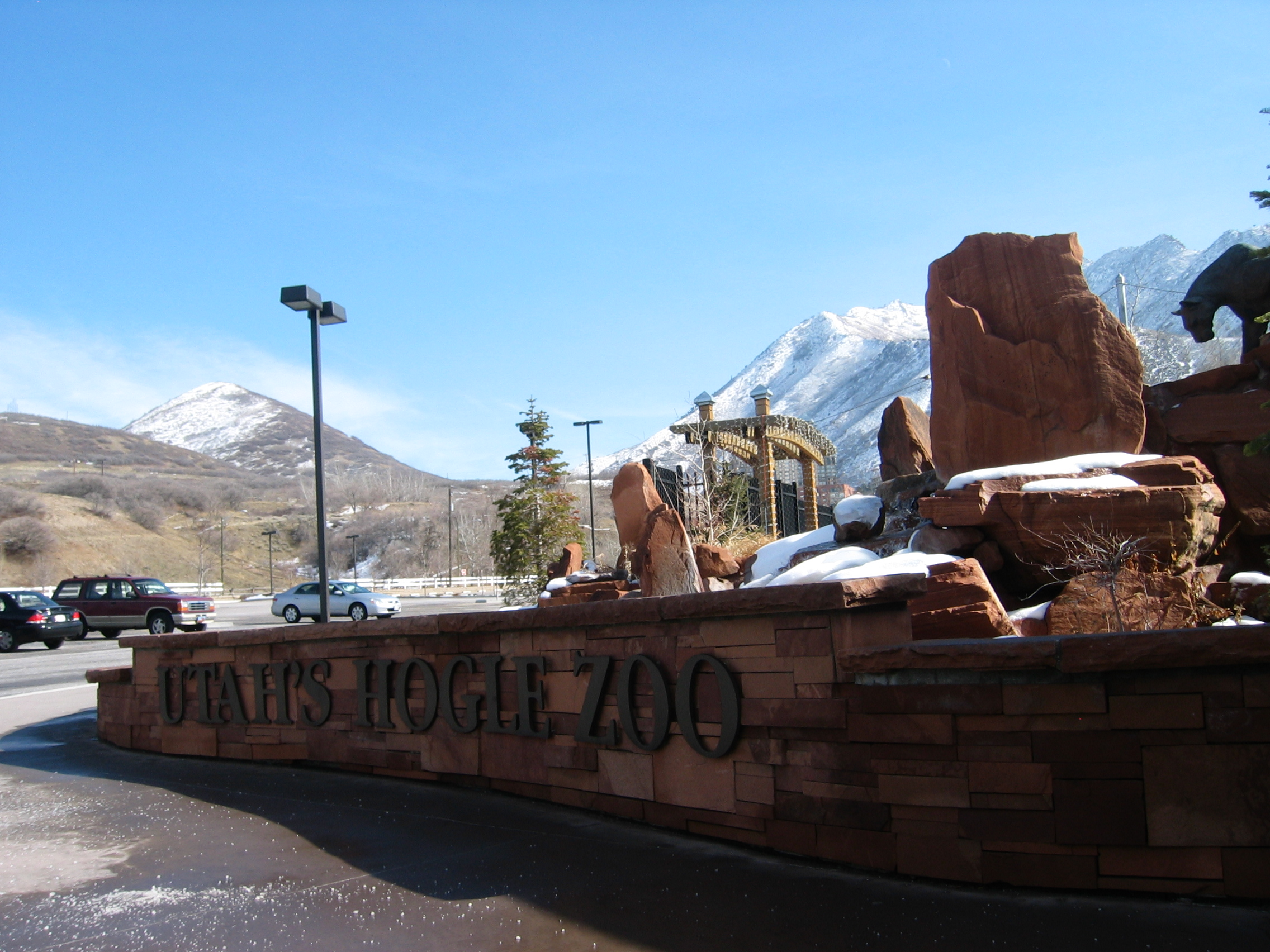
Hogle Zoo

- Artesian Well Park - contains a natural artesian spring in use since pioneer days.
- City Creek Park - park which contains a daylit portion of City Creek
- Brigham Young Historic Park - park near Temple Square which honors early pioneer efforts
- Ensign Peak - hill and nature park just north of downtown Salt Lake City.
- First Encampment Park - site of the first encampment by European-Americans in Salt Lake Valley.
- Gilgal Sculpture Garden - a small park featuring eccentric Mormonism-based stone carvings.
- Hogle Zoo - far east in the foothills. By most of the hospitals in northern Salt Lake
- International Peace Gardens - founded after World War II to promote peace. Located in Glendale.
- Liberty Park - public park featuring an aviary and other attractions.
- Main Street Plaza - parcel of land that was once Main Street, which the LDS Church controversially bought to make a pedestrian thoroughfare and connect its major properties.
- Memory Grove - World War I and war dead memorial park.
- Pioneer Park - site of first Mormon fort in Salt Lake City, currently a public park.
- Red Butte Garden and Arboretum - located in the foothills of Salt Lake City, has many exhibits and holds concerts in the summer.
- Salt Lake City Cemetery - Largest cemetery in Utah
- Sugar House Park - site of the first state prison See Utah State Prison history.
- Temple Square - A downtown religious campus for the Church of Jesus Christ of Latter-day Saints (sometimes called the LDS Church).
- University of Utah - campus on east side of the city.
- Utah Museum of Contemporary Art - contemporary and formerly modern art museum located in downtown Salt Lake City, founded in 1931.
- Utah Museum of Fine Arts - home to over 20,000 individual artworks housed inside the museum's 20 galleries, one of the largest permanent collections in the Western United States.
- Utah Museum of Natural History
- Washington Square - public park surrounding the city offices.

== Olympic attractions ==
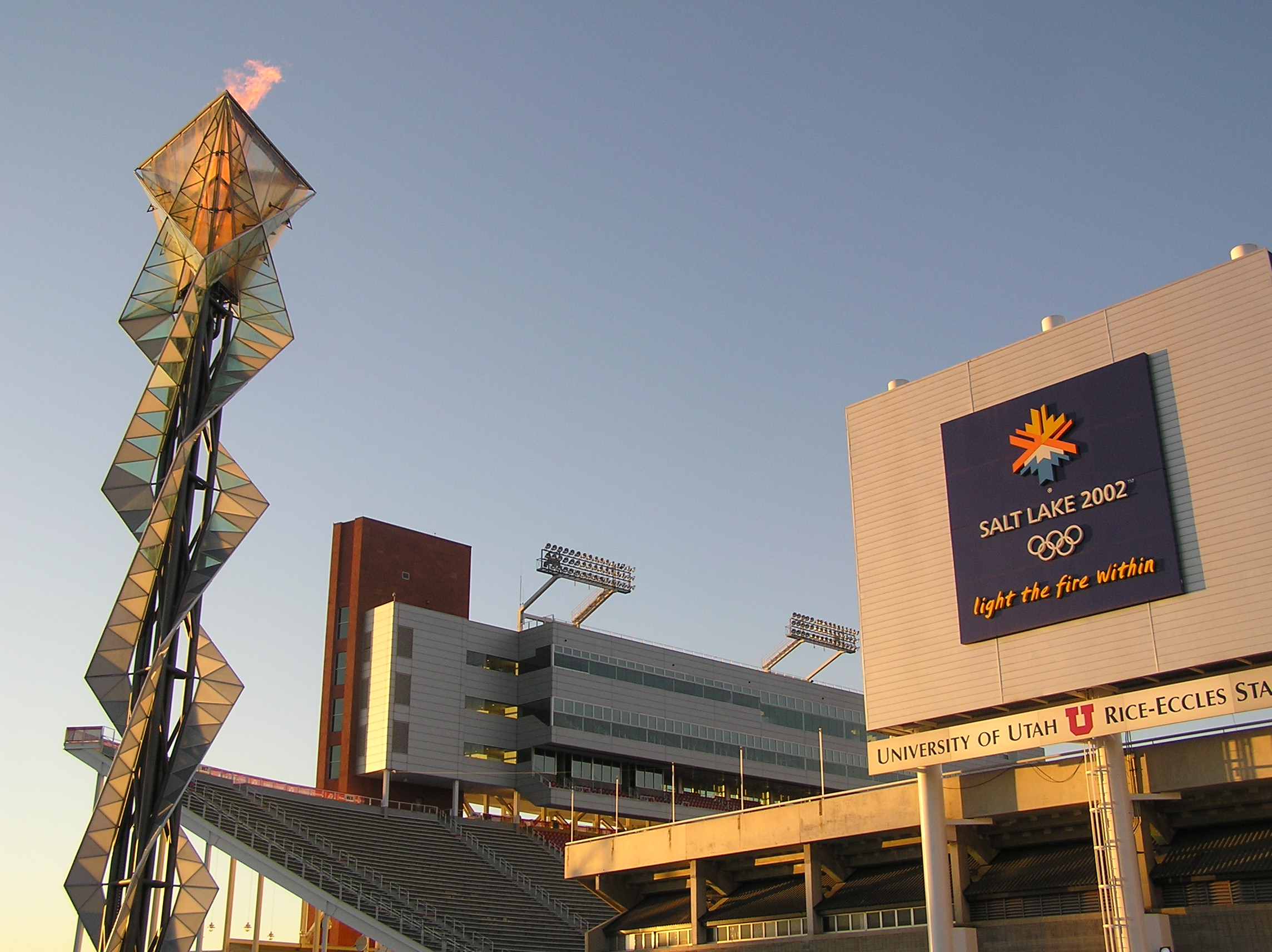
Salt Lake 2002 Olympic Cauldron Park

- Olympic and Paralympic Cauldron Plaza - Located at Rice-Eccles Stadium, home of the 2002 Winter Olympics cauldron
- Olympic Legacy Plaza - Located at The Gateway, features an Olympic fountain, with a water show set to music every hour.

== Buildings ==
Religious, particularly LDS buildings, are prominent in Salt Lake City.

Settled by Brigham Young and 147 other pioneers on July 24, 1847, these Latter-day Saints were fleeing persecution after the death of Joseph Smith. Young originally intended the city and territory to be a religious theocracy. Although the government has long been secular, and even though less than 50% of residents in Salt Lake City are LDS, the city has a large number of religious buildings. It is the headquarters of the Church of Jesus Christ of Latter-day Saints.

Unless noted, all of these buildings are in or around Downtown Salt Lake City.

=== Religious ===
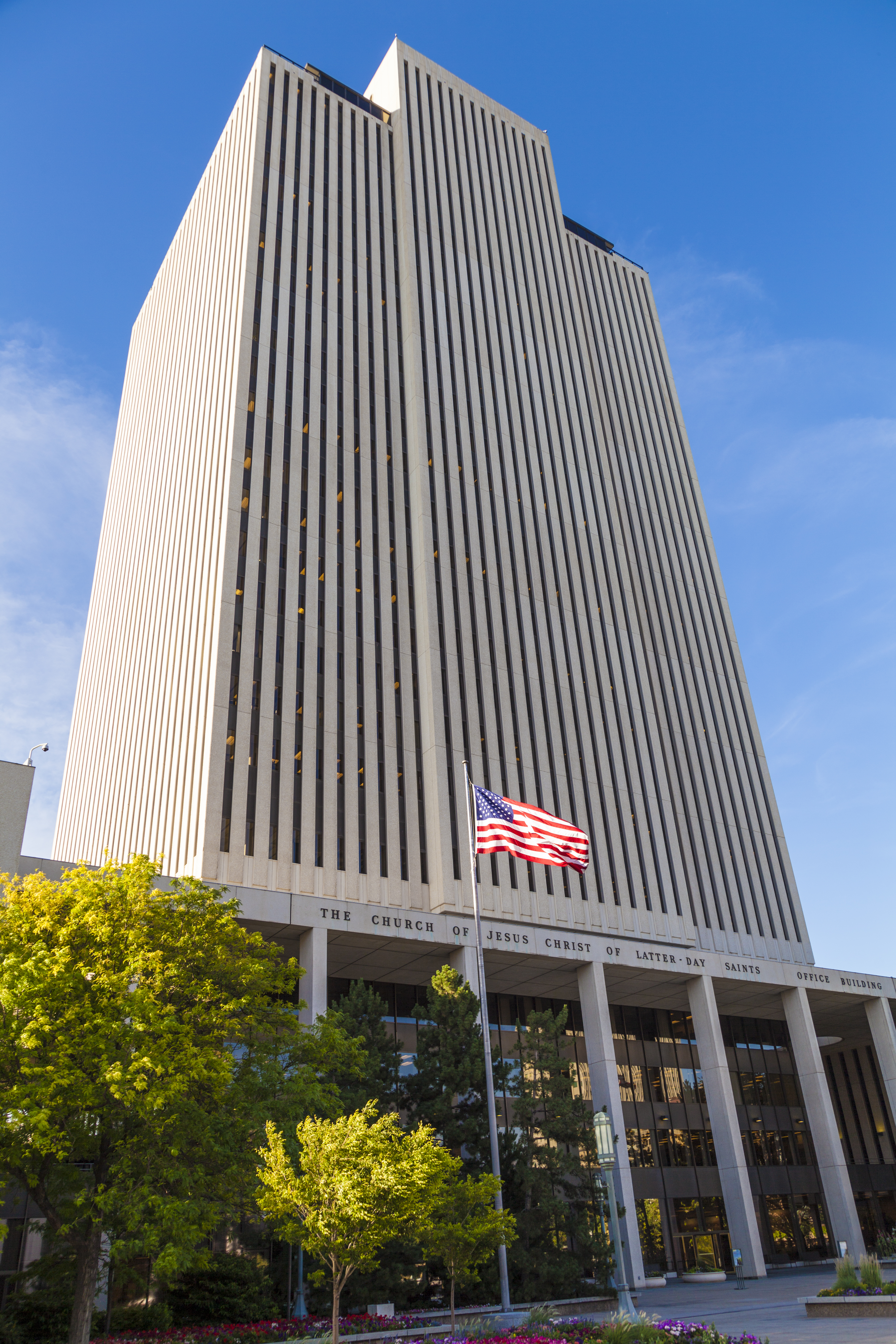
Church Office Building

==== The Church of Jesus Christ of Latter-day Saints (LDS Church) ====
- 19th Ward Meetinghouse and Relief Society Hall - Old and unusual LDS ward house on Capitol Hill featuring an onion dome steeple, now home of the small, professional Salt Lake Acting Company.
- Brigham Young Complex, includes:
  - Beehive House - Brigham Young's main home.
  - Lion House - Another of Young's homes and his death place.
  - Mormon Pioneer Memorial Monument - Burial place of Young and his family members.
- Conference Center - spacious new meeting hall that replaced the Tabernacle as the venue for General Conference.
- Garden Park Ward - stately LDS ward house surrounded by beautiful gardens and duck pond with stream formed from the Red Butte Creek. A popular location for wedding photography in the Gilmer Park area of the city
- Joseph Smith Memorial Building - formerly the elegant Hotel Utah.
- LDS Church Office Building - skyscraper and world headquarters of the LDS Church
- Salt Lake Assembly Hall - another historic building on Temple Square.
- Salt Lake Tabernacle - innovative domed pioneer-era meeting hall on Temple Square. Lent its name to the Mormon Tabernacle Choir.
- Salt Lake Temple - possibly the most significant building in Mormonism, on Temple Square.

==== Other faiths ====
- Cathedral of the Madeline - Salt Lake City's Roman Catholic cathedral in the lower Avenues.
- First Church of Christ, Scientist
- First Presbyterian Church of Salt Lake City - second oldest non-Latter-day Saint church building in Salt Lake still in use.
- Holy Trinity Cathedral - a Greek Orthodox Church in Greek Town
- St. Mark's Cathedral - oldest non-Latter-day Saint church building in Salt Lake still in use; cathedral of the Utah diocese of the Episcopal Church in the United States of America.
- White Community Memorial Chapel - historic LDS chapel, now a non-denominational church house on Capitol Hill.

=== Government ===
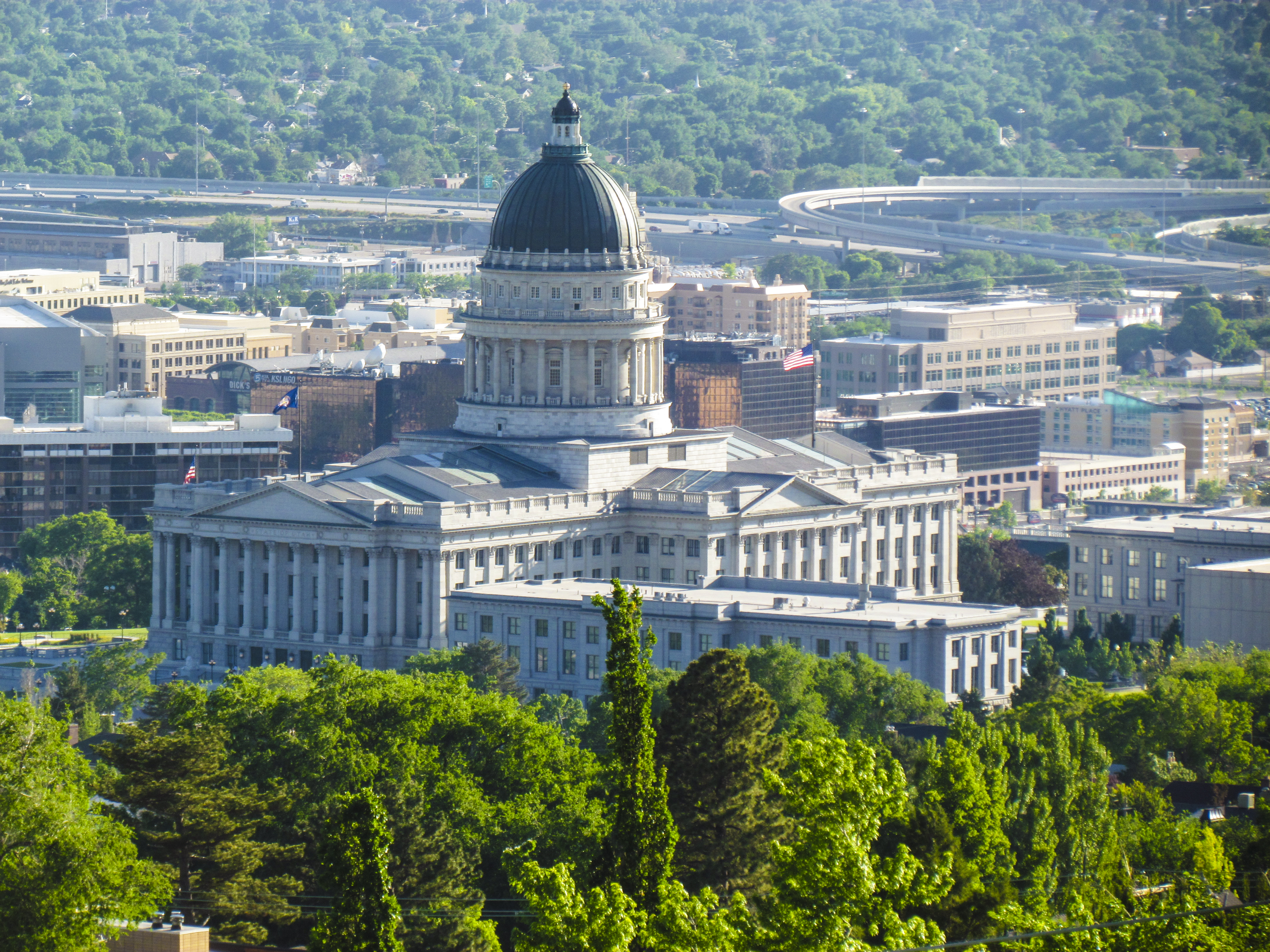
Utah State Capitol

- Frank E. Moss United States Courthouse - federal courthouse (UA Government)
- U.S. Courthouse for the District of Utah (opened 2014; 351 South West Temple Street) - federal courthouse (UA Government)
- Salt Lake City and County Building (opened 1894; 451 South State Street) - historic seat of Salt Lake City government. (Salt Lake City and County Government)
- Salt Lake City Council Hall (opened 1866; 300 North State Street) - old city hall, on Capitol Hill (Salt Lake City Government)
- Scott M. Matheson Courthouse (opened 1996; 450 South State Street) - houses Utah Supreme Court; Utah Court of Appeals, Utah State Law Library (Utah State Government)
- Utah Governor's Mansion (also known as the Thomas Kearns Home) (built 1900; 603 East South Temple Street) - governor's mansion, on South Temple at the foot of the Avenues. (Utah State Government)
- Utah State Capitol (completed 1916, renovated 2004-08; 350 North State Street) - on Capitol Hill, modeled after the nation's Capitol. (Utah State Government)
- Utah State Correctional Facility (state prison opened July 2022)
- Abravanel Hall- Performing Arts hall (Salt Lake County Government)
- Marriott Library- Library at University of Utah (Utah State Government)
- Kingsbury Hall- Performing arts center at The University of Utah (Utah State Government)
- Park Building - administrative and iconic building of the University of Utah. (Utah State Government)
- Salt Lake City Public Library - large new Main City Library designed by Moshe Safdie. (Salt Lake City Government)
- Simmons Pioneer Memorial Theatre - large proscenium theatre, home of the regional Pioneer Theatre Company; on the campus of the University of Utah. (Utah State Government)
- The Leonardo - former library building, now an arts center. (Utah State Government)
- Utah Museum of Fine Arts - museum at the University of Utah specializing in Mountain West artwork. (Utah State Government)
- Utah Museum of Natural History (Utah State Government)
- Jon M. Huntsman Center - main indoor arena at the University of Utah (Utah State Government)
- Rice-Eccles Stadium - football stadium for the University of Utah; site of the opening and closing ceremonies of the 2002 Winter Olympics; also the former home to the Major League Soccer team Real Salt Lake (Utah State Government)
- Salt Lake City International Airport - west of Rose Park, but only 5 miles from Downtown (Salt Lake City Government)
- Salt Palace - large convention center (Salt Lake City Government)
- International Peace Gardens - founded after World War II to promote peace. Located in Glendale. (UA Government)
- Liberty Park - public park featuring an aviary and other attractions. (Utah State Government)
- Red Butte Garden and Arboretum - located in the foothills of Salt Lake City, has many exhibits and holds concerts in the summer. (Utah State Government)
- Salt Lake City Cemetery - Largest cemetery in Utah (Salt Lake City Government)
- Sugar House Park - site of the first state prison See Utah State Prison history. (Salt Lake City Government)
- University of Utah - campus on east side of the city. (Utah State Government)

=== Educational/arts ===
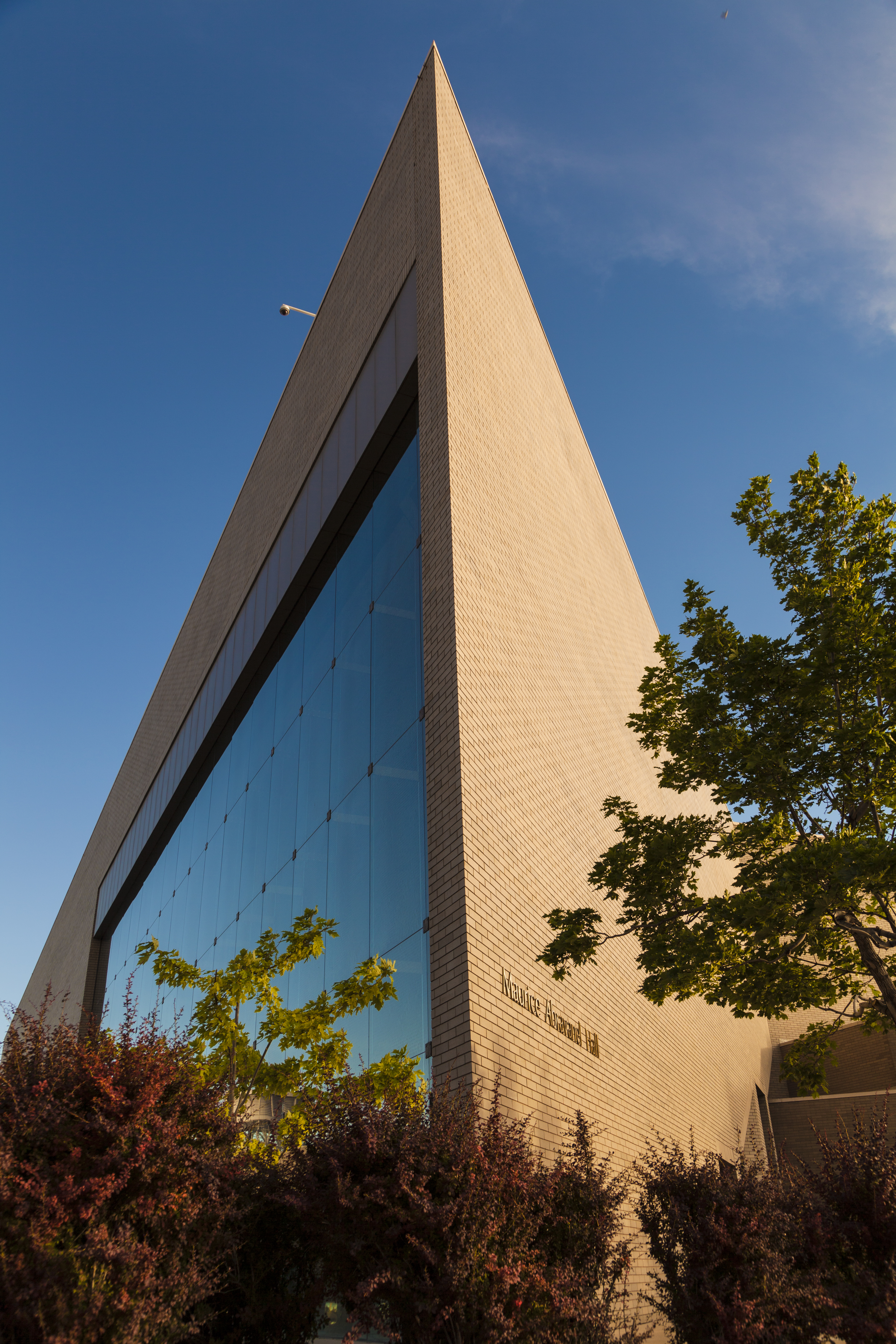
Abravanel Hall

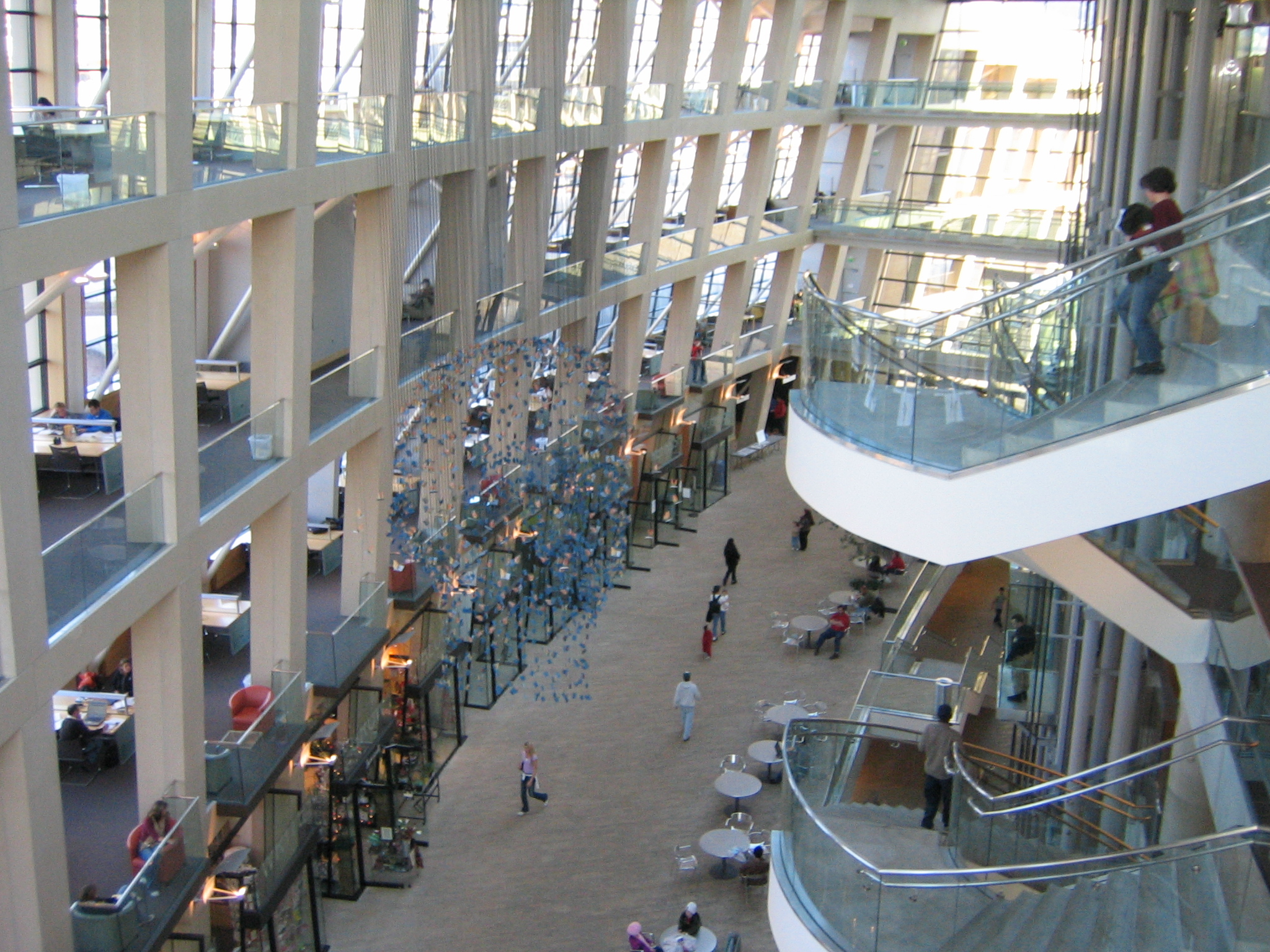
The interior of the Salt Lake City Public Library

- Abravanel Hall - home of the Utah Symphony Orchestra.
- Clark Planetarium - new planetarium at the Gateway.
- Capitol Theatre - home to Utah Opera Company, Ballet West, and frequently host to large-scale touring productions.
- Clift Building - home of the Off-Broadway theatre, which features plays and Utah's longest-running improv comedy troupe, Laughing Stock.
- Eccles Theater- touring Broadway and performing arts theater
- Family History Library - largest genealogical library in the world, maintained by the LDS Church.
- Hansen Planetarium - historic building old main library and home to the planetarium before it moved to the Clark Planetarium.
- Marriott Library - University of Utah library.
- Kingsbury Hall - center for the performing arts located on the University of Utah campus.
- Park Building - administrative and iconic building of the University of Utah.
- Museum of Utah - official state history museum.
- Pioneer Memorial Museum - Mormon pioneer museum.
- Salt Lake City Public Library - large new Main City Library designed by Moshe Safdie.
- Simmons Pioneer Memorial Theatre - large proscenium theatre, home of the regional Pioneer Theatre Company; on the campus of the University of Utah.
- The Leonardo - former library building, now an arts center.
- Utah Museum of Contemporary Art - contemporary and formerly modern art museum located in downtown Salt Lake City, founded in 1931.
- Utah Museum of Fine Arts - home to over 20,000 individual artworks housed inside the museum's 20 galleries, one of the largest permanent collections in the Western United States.
- Utah Museum of Natural History
- Villa Theatre - Formerly a renowned cinema celebrated for its design and history, it has now become Adib's Persian Rug Gallery, a premier Persian rug store.

=== Commercial ===
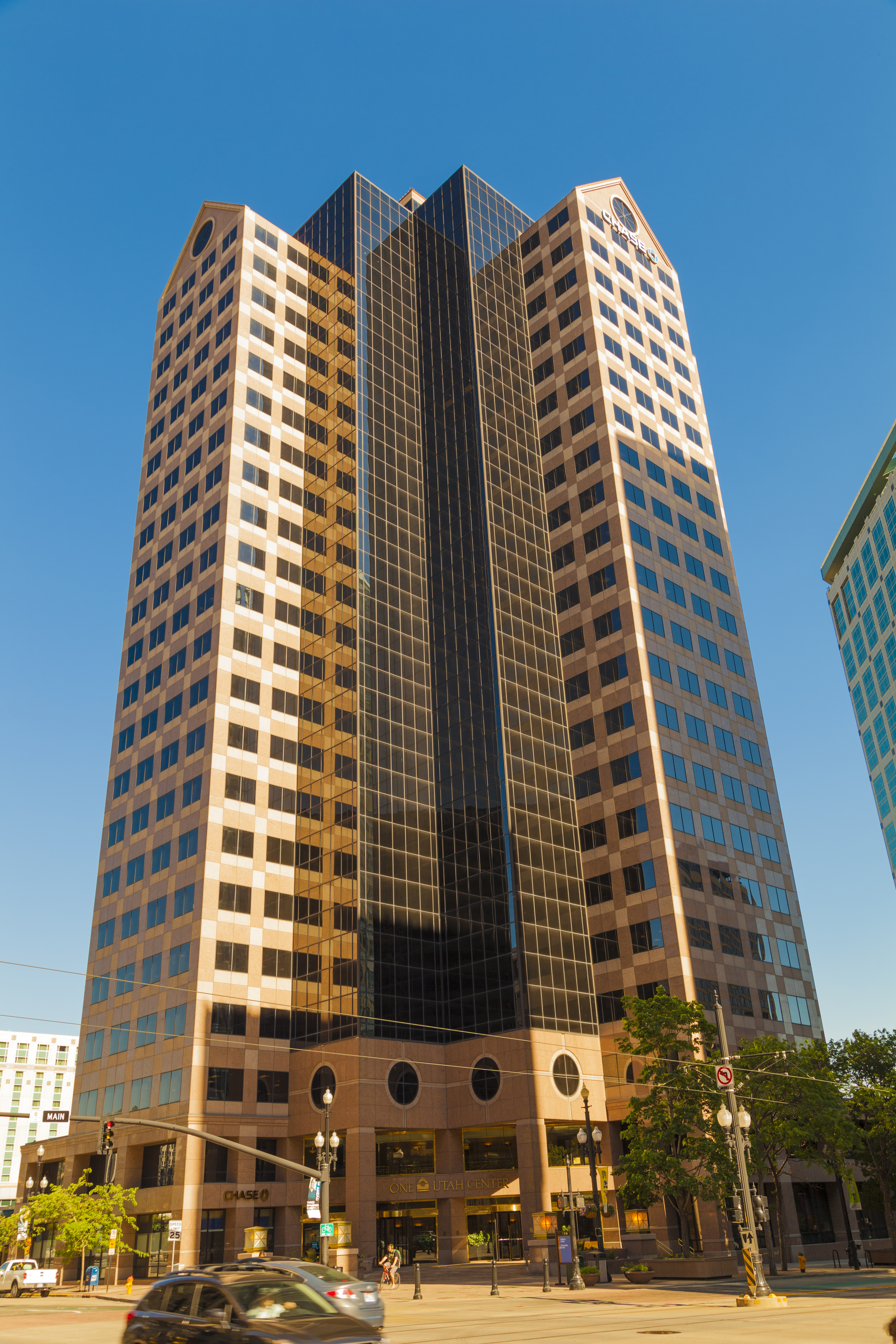
One Utah Center

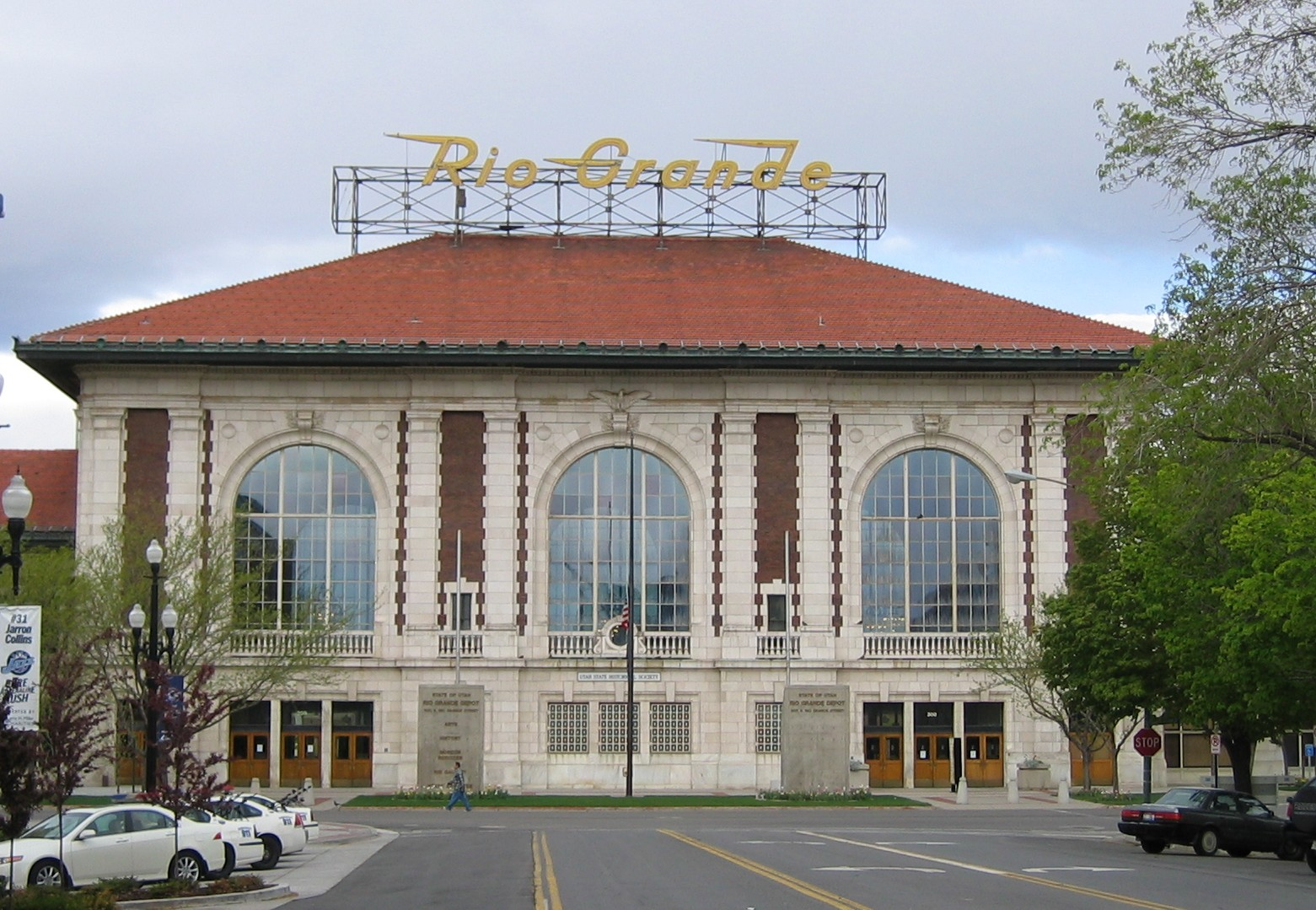
Rio Grande Depot

- 111 Main - LEED Gold-certified skyscraper in Downtown Salt Lake City, currently the state's 3rd tallest building.
- 222 South Main - Utah's first LEED Gold certified high-rise, designed by Skidmore, Owings & Merrill.
- 95 State - also colloquially referred to as Tower 8, or Big Blue by locals; a commercial skyscraper currently under construction on 100 S and State Streets. The tower will be the state's third tallest upon completion, which is set for 2022.
- City Creek Center - shopping, dining, and residential complex along Main Street just south of Temple Square. Replaced Crossroads Plaza and ZCMI Center Mall.
- Deseret News Building - former home of the daily Deseret News
- First Security Bank Building - 1950s international style skyscraper
- The Gateway - pedestrian mall
- Jon M. Huntsman Center - main indoor arena at the University of Utah
- Kearns Building - built by mining magnate and U.S. Senator Thomas Kearns. For years it was considered the center of business in Salt Lake City
- One Utah Center - twenty-four story granite-clad skyscraper
- Rice-Eccles Stadium - football stadium for the University of Utah; site of the opening and closing ceremonies of the 2002 Winter Olympics; also the former home to the Major League Soccer team Real Salt Lake
- Rio Grande Depot - historic railroad station, originally built by Denver & Rio Grande Western Railroad in 1910 and also used by the Western Pacific Railroad, Los Angeles and Salt Lake Railroad and Amtrak between 1986 and 1999. Today the headquarters of the Utah State Historical Society.
- Salt Lake City Union Pacific Depot - another historic railroad station, originally named the Union Station, built jointly by the San Pedro, Los Angeles & Salt Lake and the Oregon Short Line Railroads.
- Salt Lake City International Airport - west of Rose Park, five miles from Downtown
- Salt Lake Regional Medical Center - hospital built around Sisters of the Holy Cross Chapel, originally Holy Cross Hospital
- Salt Palace - large convention center
- Tribune Building - Main Street (across from Kearns Building) named for The Salt Lake Tribune which had long inhabited it
- Vivint Arena (formerly the Delta Center/Energy Solutions Arena) - home of the Utah Jazz NBA basketball team
- Walker Center - national historic skyscraper constructed in 1912
- Wells Fargo Center - current tallest skyscraper in Salt Lake City, constructed in 1998
- ZCMI Center Mall - a former downtown mall with façade of old ZCMI department store

=== Residences ===
- Alfred McCune Home - lavish turn-of-the-century Capitol Hill mansion.
- David Keith Mansion - partner of Thomas Kearns in the Silver King Coalition Mine.
- George M. Cannon House - 1890 mansion in the Forest Dale section built by George Mousley Cannon, the developer of Forest Dale and a member of the Intermountain West's prominent Cannon family.
- Thomas Kearns Mansion- built by mining magnate and U.S. Senator Thomas Kearns. Now the Utah State Governor's Mansion, the largest in the United States.
- Walker-McCarthey Mansion
- Woodruff-Riter-Stewart Home - another Capitol Hill mansion.

=== Fraternal ===
- Salt Lake Masonic Temple - seat of Freemasonry in Salt Lake City and Masonic government in Utah

== Monuments ==
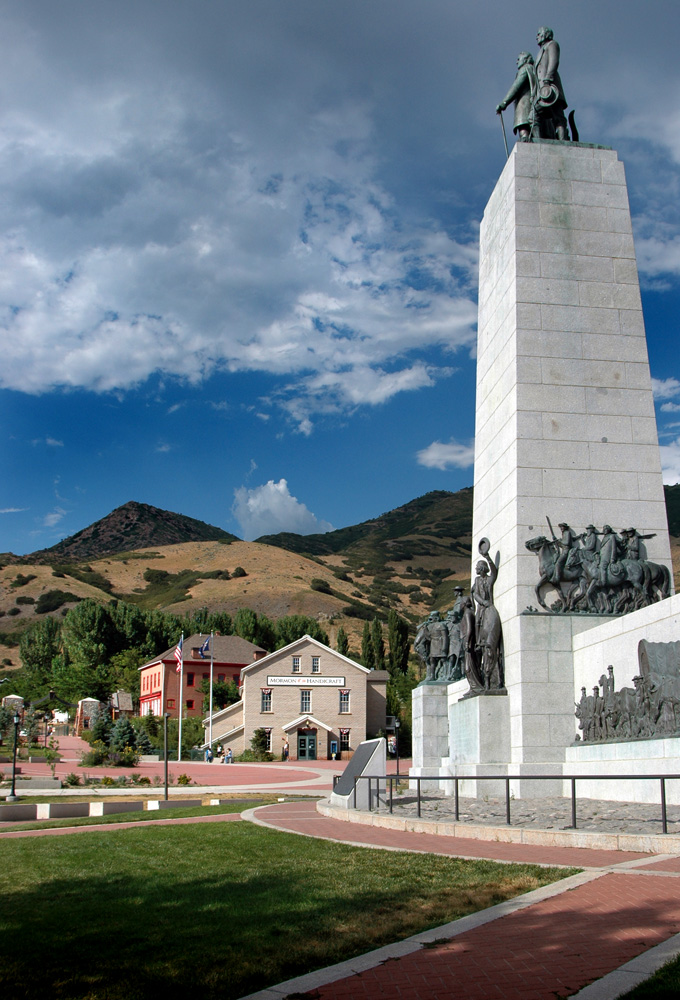
"This is the Place" monument

- Brigham Young Monument - monument at Main Street to Brigham Young and the original 147 pioneers.
- Eagle Gate - gate remnant to the original city wall.
- Seagull Monument - LDS monument celebrating the Miracle of the Gulls.
- This Is The Place Monument - monument high in the east near Hogle Zoo commemorating Brigham Young's words when entering the valley: "This is the right place, drive on."

== Transportation ==
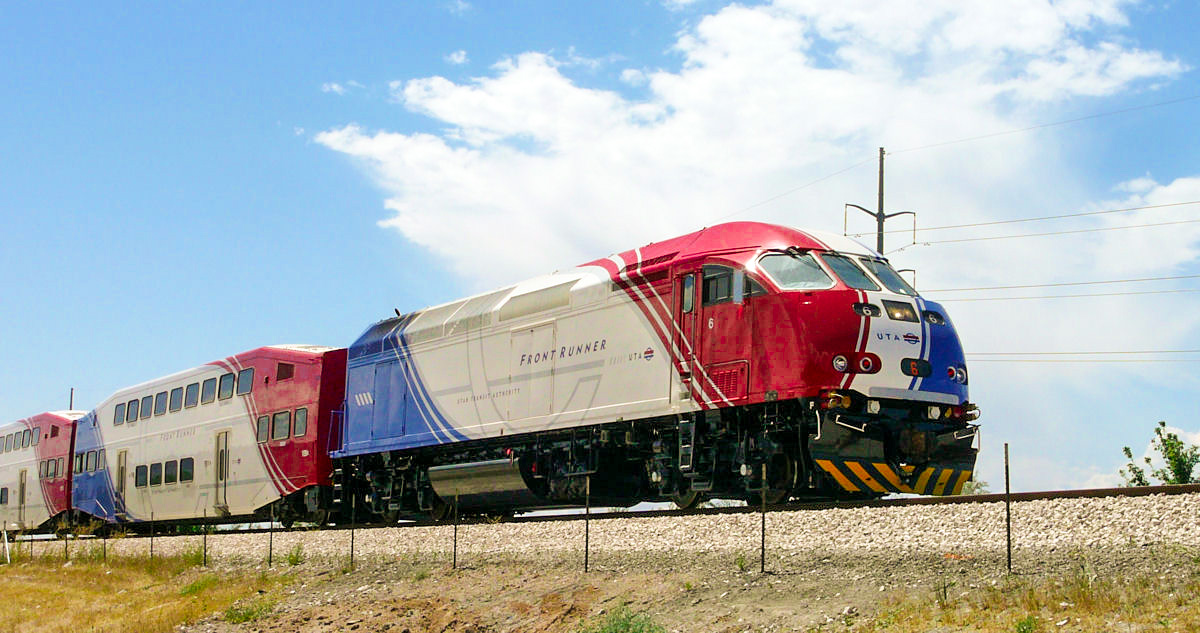
A FrontRunner diesel train

- FrontRunner - UTA commuter rail system that runs the entire length of Salt Lake County, extending north through Davis County to Ogden on the northern edge of Weber County and south to Provo in the center of Utah County, on a route roughly paralleling Interstate 15. FrontRunner has two stops within Salt Lake City: Salt Lake Central (Salt Lake Intermodal Hub) and North Temple.
- TRAX - Utah Transit Authority (UTA) light rail system running nearly the entire length of Salt Lake County. The north-south line begins at the Salt Lake City Intermodal Hub (Salt Lake Central) in the western part of Downtown Salt Lake City and runs south to the center of Draper. There are also lines that run east to the University of Utah, west to the Salt Lake City International Airport, west to West Valley City, and southwest to South Jordan. As of 2026, there are 23 TRAX Stations within the limits of Salt Lake City proper.
  - 900 East, 900 South, 1940 W North Temple, Airport, Arena, Ballpark, City Center, Courthouse, Fairpark, Fort Douglas, Gallivan Plaza, Jackson/Euclid, Library, North Temple Bridge/Guadalupe, Old GreekTown, Planetarium, Power, Stadium, Temple Square, Trolley, University Medical Center, University South Campus, 600 South
- S Line - UTA operated streetcar (formerly known as Sugar House Streetcar) opened for service in December 2013 and connects the Sugar House area of Salt Lake City with the city of South Salt Lake, as well as the TRAX system. Phase I of Sugar House Streetcar has 3 stops within Salt Lake City, but Phase II (all of which will be in Salt Lake City) has a yet to be determined route and number of stops.
