= Jackson Square =

Jackson Square may refer to:

== Places ==
- Jackson Square (New Orleans), a public square in Louisiana, U.S.
- Jackson Square, San Francisco, a neighborhood in California, U.S.
- Jackson Square (Salt Lake City), a neighborhood in Utah, U.S.
- Jackson Square, a neighborhood in Jamaica Plain, Massachusetts, U.S.
  - Jackson Square station
- Jackson Square Park, in Manhattan, New York, U.S.
- Lloyd D. Jackson Square, a shopping mall in Ontario, Canada

== Music ==
- Jackson Square (album), by Arkells, 2008
