= Cole Shopping Center =

Former shopping mall in Cheyenne, Wyoming, U.S.

- Location: Cheyenne, Wyoming, United States
- Coordinates: 41°8′41.36″N 104°47′19.58″W
- Address: 400 Cole Shopping Center
- Opened: 1954; 72 years ago
- Closed: 2019
- Demolished: 2019

The Cole Shopping Center was a shopping plaza in the city of Cheyenne, Wyoming. Located just east of Converse Avenue and between E Pershing Blvd and Chestnut Dr, the plaza occupied over 350,000 square feet of land. Frank Maurice Cole bought the land that would eventually be occupied by Safeway as well as many smaller-format businesses that made up Cole Shopping Center. The plaza was easily recognized by its neon sign. In the end, after several years of being mostly abandoned, it was demolished for Blue Federal Credit Union's world headquarters and the Blue Diamond Center retail center.

== History ==
Cole Shopping Center opened in 1954. It was one of Cheyenne's earliest suburban-style plazas, and in its heyday, it boasted many smaller-format shops in addition to its Safeway store. The Safeway even featured a seafood department, deli, and bakery.

One of the earliest expansions occurred around the turn of the 1960s with a new building built on the south edge of the property which contained roughly three tenants, including a bank known as First Education FCU. In the mid-1960s, additional small-format businesses (including the Cole Department Store), and a new Safeway store was built behind the original Safeway store. In the mid-1970s, a movie theater called Cole Square Cinemas was built on the corner of Converse Avenue and E Pershing Blvd, featuring two screens. A restaurant was built just north of the new Safeway building in 1976, most recently known as Crossroads. The newly built Safeway building received an expansion to the north in the late 1970s, along with the addition of a mezzanine on the front of the building. Around the turn of the 1980s, an additional screen was added to the south edge of the movie theater.

By the 2000s, many tenants were beginning to close or move to other locations. The Cole Square Cinemas, most recently a Carmike Cinemas theater, closed in 2010. In the early 2010s, Safeway purchased the Cole Shopping Center with plans to build a new store and renovate the property starting in 2014. This would be the third time a brand new Safeway store would be built on the land except that it never happened. In 2015, the merger between Albertsons and Safeway was complete. In May 2015, plans were announced to renovate the nearby Albertsons at the corner of E Pershing Blvd and Ridge Rd. About a year later, in April 2016, the Safeway at Cole Shopping Center closed. RadioShack, one of the last remaining tenants in the plaza, closed in late 2016.

Blue Federal Credit Union officially announced they were planning to build their headquarters at the former plaza in November 2018. Around the start of 2019, demolition began taking place, with a large part of the Safeway building mostly demolished by the time of the groundbreaking celebration for the world headquarters in May 2019. Demolition continued throughout the summer, and was completed by August.
