= Museum of Utah =

State history museum in Salt Lake City

- Michael O. Leavitt Building, housing the Museum of Utah

- Location within Utah
- Established: 27 June 2026
- Location: Salt Lake City, Utah, United States
- Coordinates: 40.7787°N 111.8882°W
- Type: history
- Collection size: 30,000 items
- Director: Tim Glenn
- Architects: ajc architects VCBO Architecture
- Owner: State of Utah
- Website: history.utah.gov/museum

The Museum of Utah is the state history museum of Utah. Operated by the Utah State Historical Society, it also houses the state's history research center and is located at the Utah State Capitol complex in Salt Lake City, Utah. The museum opened in June 2026, becoming the state's first official history museum.

== Description ==
The museum and its accompanying collection facility take up 67,854 square feet (6,303.8 m^{2}) on two and a half floors of the Michael O. Leavitt Building. This includes the public exhibit spaces, classroom space, staff offices, conservation areas, and storage space. The basement collection level, which stores objects not on display, is isolated from the upper floors of the building, and includes different environmental zones to provide different protection to varying collection types.

=== Exhibits ===
A handcart pulled by Mormon pioneers to Utah Territory in 1868 on display in the museum

The society's collection includes 30,000 objects, however only approximately 950 will be on display at a time, with items being regularly rotated between storage and exhibition. One of the flagship pieces of the collection includes the Mormon Meteor III.

The main floor of the building houses the museum's four permanent galleries, which include:

- Becoming Utah: Focuses on Native Americans in Utah and early settlers, including the Mormon pioneers
- Connecting Utah: History of events, faith, shared experiences, sports and so forth
- Building Utah: Growth and history of Utah's industries, cities and infrastructure
- Inspiring Utah: Highlights the state's pop culture, including the 2002 Winter Olympics

=== Artwork ===
Capping the building's four-story atrium is a 25-by-25-foot (7.6 by 7.6 m) domed window, made of 14,000 individual pieces of colored glass. Designed by Holdman Studios, it cost $1.6 million. Symbols of Utah, such as Dead Horse Point, Rainbow Bridge, the Pando aspen clone, a Rocky Mountain elk, Bonneville cutthroat trout, and Utahraptor skull are found within the artwork.

== Construction and opening ==
Prior to building the museum, the state historical society's collection of artifacts, photographs, manuscripts, and books were stored in the basement of the Denver and Rio Grande Western Depot. The depot was not equipped for proper storage of the collection nor was the building strengthened against earthquakes, so by 2018, the historical society was asking the Utah State Legislature to fund construction of a new building.

Over the next few years, the state developed plans to replace the 1961 State Office Building on Capitol Hill with a new structure to house the collection. While the museum was still in the planning stages, the 2020 Salt Lake City earthquake struck the Salt Lake Valley, causing damage to the depot building, but sparing the historical collection. However, due to necessary repairs to the depot building, the collection had to be moved to temporary storage in 2021, where it would remain until the new museum was finished.

On June 15, 2022, state leaders broke ground on the new structure. The completed building includes a basement with four upper stories. It was built atop 99 base isolators which support the structure, protecting it against earthquakes from the Wasatch Fault below. Initially estimated to cost $165 million, due to the 2021–2023 inflation surge, along with the state's desire to enhance the structure, the final cost was $320 million. Known at first as the "North Capitol Building," a ribbon-cutting ceremony to open the structure was held January 16, 2026. In May 2026, the Capitol Preservation Board voted to rename the North Capitol Building in honor of former Utah Governor Michael O. Leavitt. The building was officially renamed during a ceremony in August 2026.

The museum, which occupies the first floor of the structure, was opened with a ribbon-cutting ceremony and community celebration on June 27, 2026.

== See also ==
- Buildings and sites of Salt Lake City
- List of museums in Utah
- Natural History Museum of Utah
- Pioneer Memorial Museum
