= Capitol Hill Historic District =

Capitol Hill Historic District may refer to:

- Capitol Hill Historic District (Salt Lake City, Utah), listed on the National Register of Historic Places (NRHP) in Utah
- Capitol Hill Historic District (Washington, D.C.), listed on the NRHP in Washington, D.C.
