= Villa Theatre =

Former movie theater in Millcreek, Utah, United States

Coordinates: 40°42′14″N 111°51′09″W

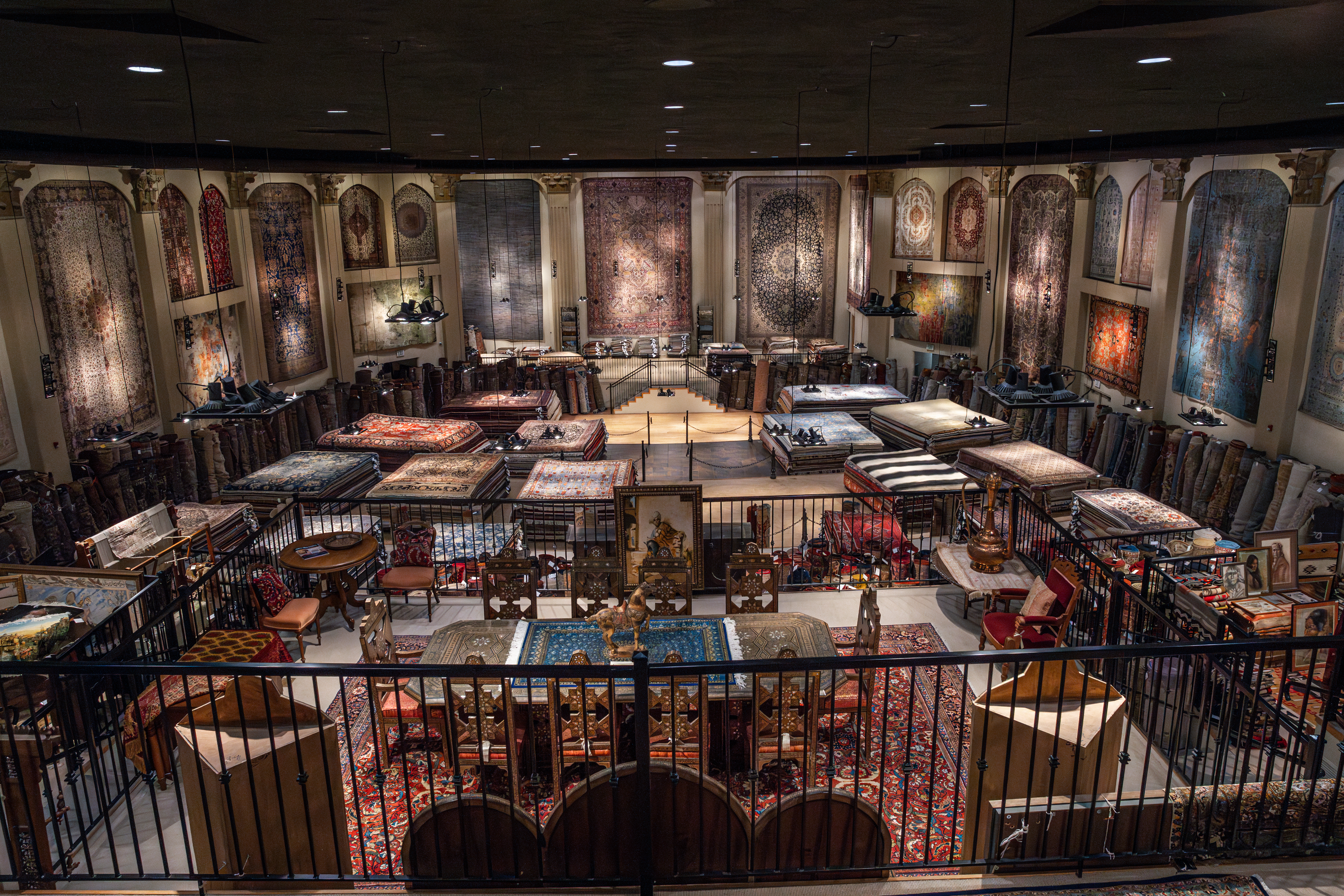
The showroom at Adib's Rug's Gallery in Salt Lake City, Utah

The Villa Theatre is a former movie theater in Millcreek, Utah, located at 3092 S. Highland Drive. The theatre was open from December 23, 1949, to February 18, 2003. In 2004, Dr. Hamid Adib purchased the old cinema and converted it into a showroom for Adib's Rug Gallery, which continues to operate at this location today.

== History ==
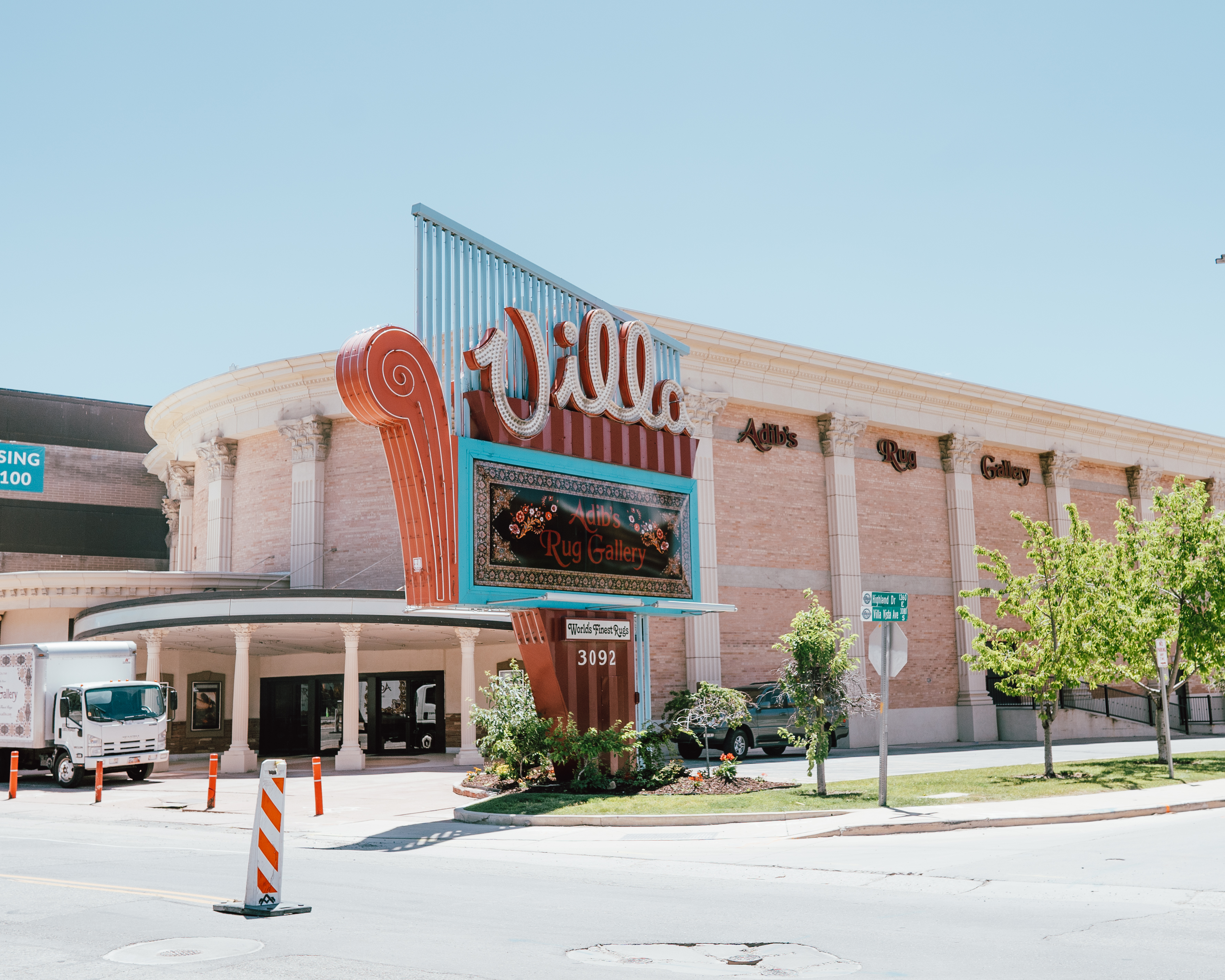
Front view of the Adib's Rug Gallery (formerly, the Villa Theater).

The Villa first opened on December 23, 1949, after being built by then-owners Joseph L. Lawrence and David K. Edwards—the first feature shown was Prince of Foxes. The theater had 1300 seats and was built using a stadium seating design that utilized rising seating on a steep incline. Throughout the 1950s and 1960s, The Villa was known for being the first Salt Lake City Theater to show new widescreen formats, including CinemaScope, Technirama-70, and Cinerama. In 1958, the theater became famous for showing a 10-month-long run of South Pacific, drawing Patrons from as far as Idaho and Nevada.

In 1960, Cinemiracle, a large, curved screen was installed, reducing the number of seats by approximately 300. A year later, Cinerama was installed, which used three projectors instead of one. This was used until 1964, when the system was replaced by a new version that used one projector and 70 mm film. There was an expected expansion to the Villa in 1977 by Mann Theatres, though the project was eventually scrapped. In 1981, the Villa was the only theater in Salt Lake City to offer the new Steven Spielberg film "Raiders of the Lost Ark".

The Villa was acquired by Carmike Cinemas in 1993. Repairs were started in 1995 and in 1996 a large renovation closed the theater shortly while the famous neon sign was restored, repairs were made to the auditorium's seat and carpets, and a Dolby Digital sound system was installed.

In 1998 Carmike Cinemas began a building spree across the Salt Lake Valley, erecting five new multiplexes. This sudden expansion lead to the ultimate demise of many first run theaters built before 1998 in the area. The only theaters left following the expansion were the Carmike 12, Holladay Centre 6, and 5 Star Cinemas.

Soon, Carmike Cinemas began to fail financially as a result of building too many multiplexes. In the fall of 2000 Carmike Cinemas entered bankruptcy and The Villa was put up for sale, with a 2.4 million dollar asking price. A sale to Eddie Simatov, owner of the Simatov Oriental Rug Gallery, fell through in 2001, and Carmike Cinemas was forced to hold onto the location.

In 2001, USA Today named the Villa Theater on a list of ten great classic theaters in the United States. This decision was criticized by some who said that the theater was run down and undeserving of the acknowledgment.

Carmike Cinemas responded by cleaning up and repairing the theater, even taking out an advertisement for the Villa hyping the summer's blockbuster hit Star Wars: Episode II – Attack of the Clones.

Even as ticket sales increased at the Villa during 2002, the financial improvement was not enough to take the theater off the market. Carmike considered simplifying or replacing the theater's neon sign, which was expensive to maintain and made maintaining a profit extremely difficult.

Wal-Mart looked into the possibility of turning the Villa into a Neighborhood Market. Instead, Harmons Grocery, which operates a grocery store near the Villa Theater, bought the property. Harmons offered to let Carmike Cinemas lease the theater, but they declined.

The last movie to be shown at the Villa Theatre was The Lord of the Rings: The Two Towers on 18 February 2003. Despite it being a weekday and the film's considerable length, it drew a large crowd for the theater's final showing. Carmike Cinemas repaired the neon on the theater's sign and marquee during the Villa's last week of operation so that it would be in perfect condition for closing night.

== Finding a New Purpose ==
After the theater officially shut its doors, Harmons started a sale of the theater to a buyer who wanted to turn it into Club Villa, a nightclub with a high-tech dance floor. Harmons seemed more interested in turning the largest profit, focusing on the historic legacy of the theatre. Harmons received many offers to turn the Villa back into a movie theater, though they did not accept any of these. Though the deal with the nightclub group seemed almost certain, it eventually fell through.

== Transformation into a Rug Gallery ==
In 2004, the Villa became a rug gallery with a sale of the theater to Dr. Hamid Adib, owner of Adib's Rug Gallery. Dr. Adib wanted to create a museum-like atmosphere, where people could enjoy the fine craftsmanship and elegant beauty of Persian and Oriental rugs while also reconnecting with the rich history of the Villa.

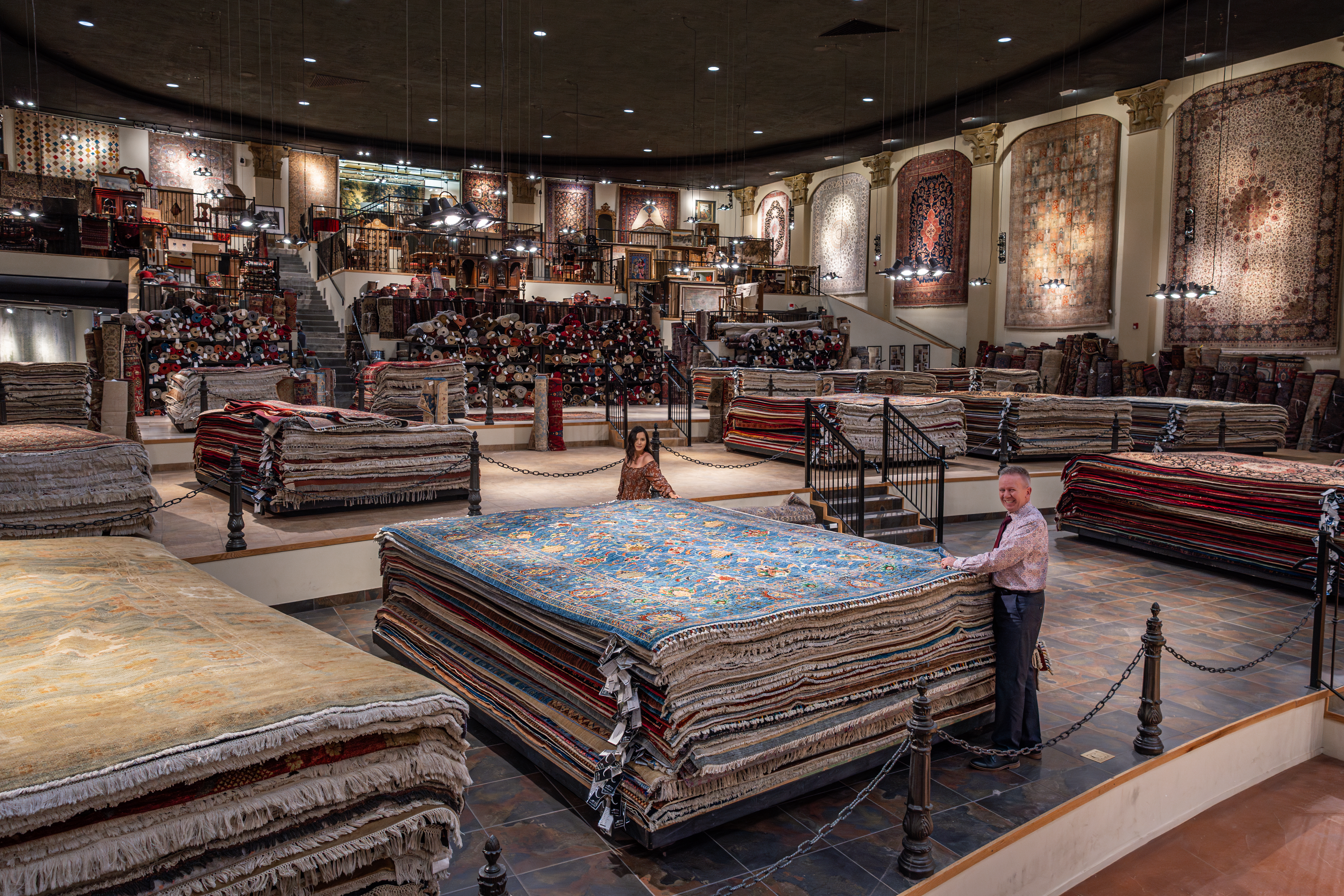
A ground level view of the showroom.

== See also ==
- Movie theater
- Multiplex
- Buildings and sites of Salt Lake City
- Cinerama
- Murray Theater
- Persian carpet
