= Holy Trinity Cathedral (Salt Lake City) =

Historic church in Salt Lake City, Utah, U.S.

- Holy Trinity Greek Orthodox Church
- U.S. National Register of Historic Places
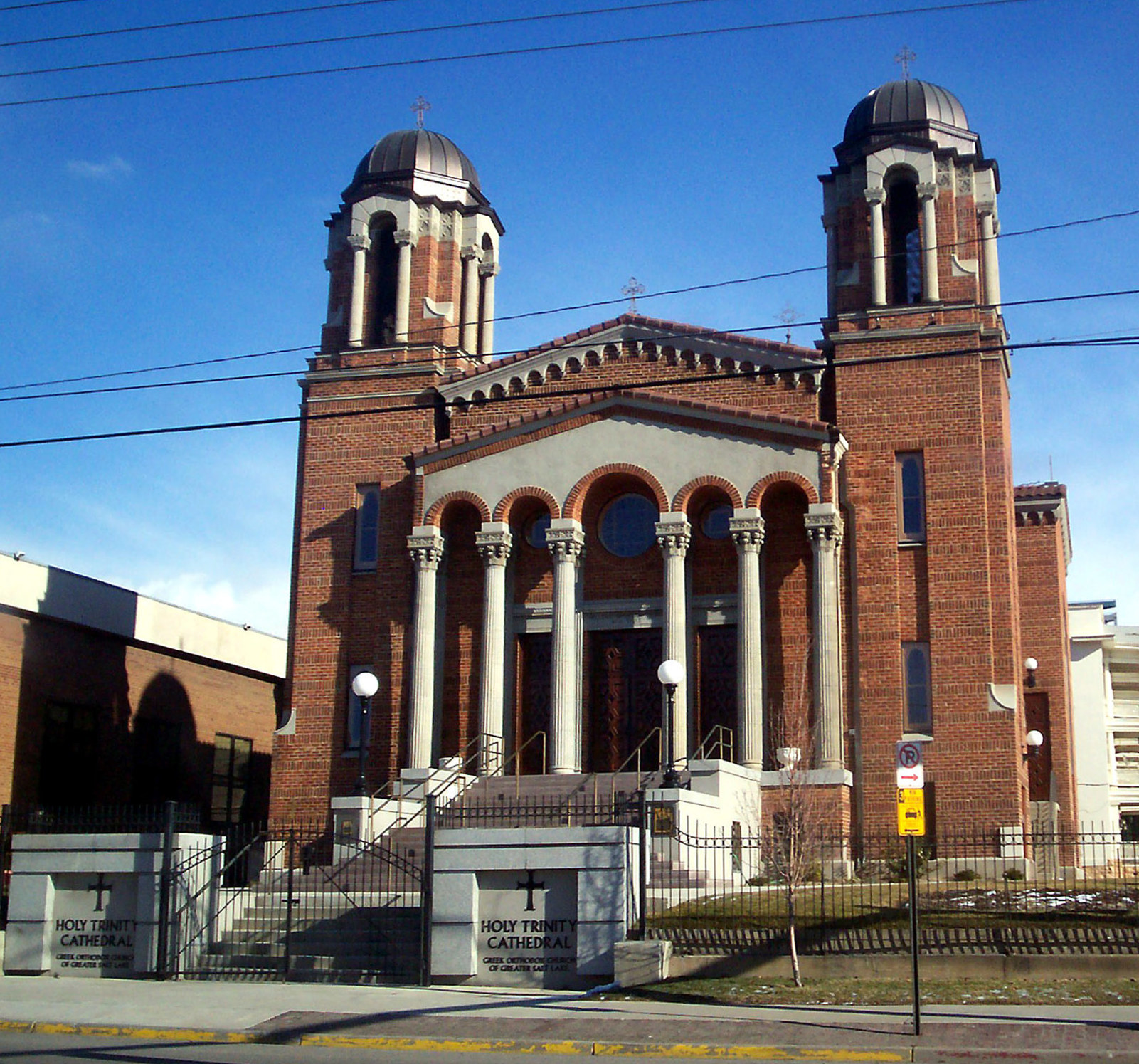
- Exterior view from the west, January 2008

- Location within Utah Location within the United States
- Location: 279 S. 300 West, Salt Lake City, Utah
- Coordinates: 40°45′47″N 111°53′57″W
- Built: 1923
- Architect: Pope & Burton; N.A. Dokas
- Architectural style: Byzantine
- NRHP reference No.: 75001816
- Added to NRHP: July 8, 1975

The Holy Trinity Cathedral, also known as Holy Trinity Greek Orthodox Church, is a Greek Orthodox cathedral in Salt Lake City, Utah, United States. Built in 1923, the church was listed on the National Register of Historic Places in 1975.

== History ==
The Greek Orthodox community of Salt Lake City organized in 1905 to form its first church, becoming the 14th Greek Orthodox parish community in the United States and the oldest between the Mississippi River and the Pacific coast. After an initial meeting in January, the community acquired a site for a church at 439 West 400 South and obtained a loan for construction. The first priest arrived from Greece in April. The first church building was dedicated on October 29, 1905, and named Holy Trinity Greek Orthodox Church.

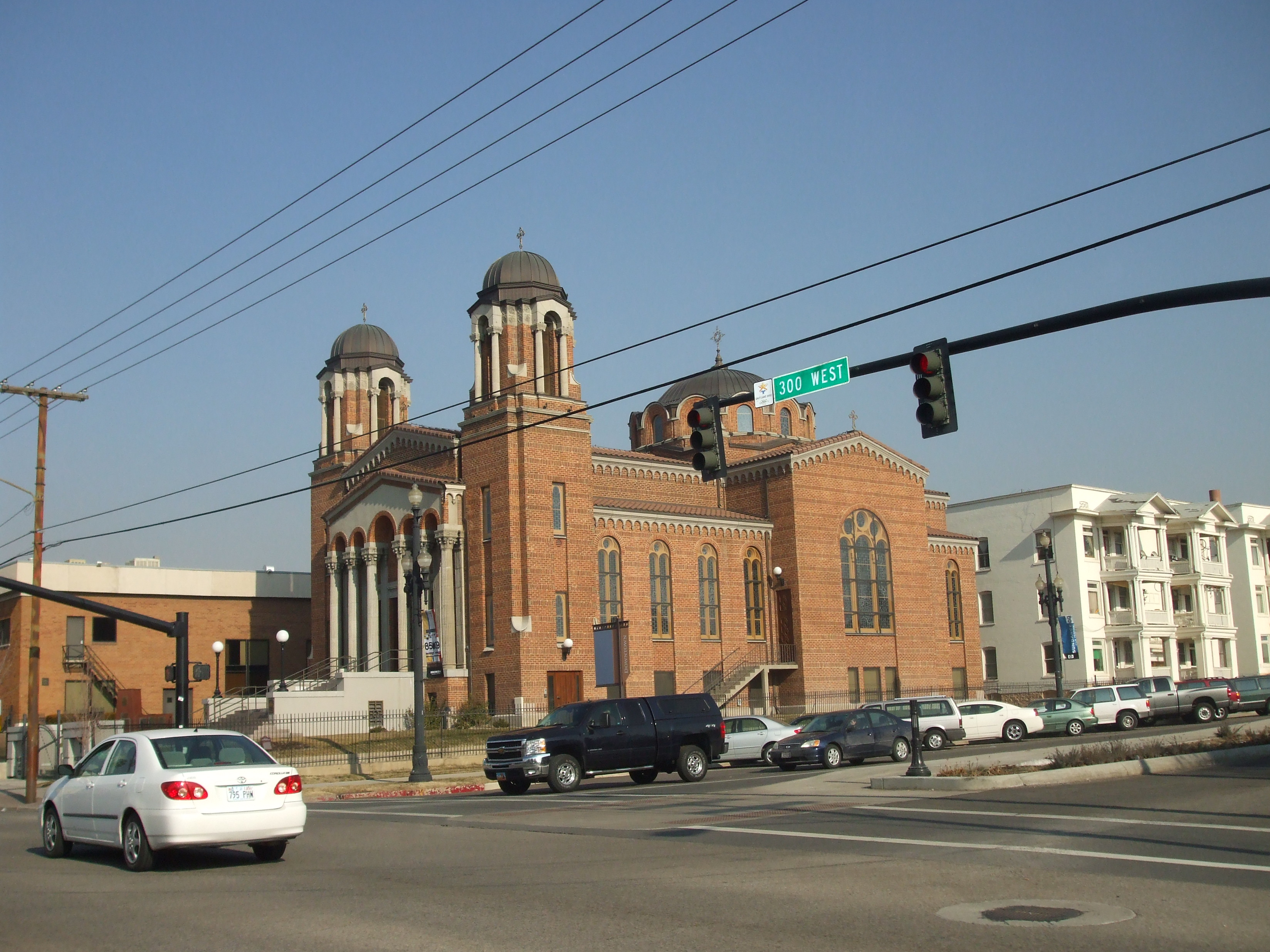
Southwest side view of the Holy Trinity Cathedral, January 2009

The church was a central element of Greek Town in the non-LDS immigrant district of Salt Lake City and served Serbian and Russian immigrants in addition to Greeks. The community quickly outgrew the original church building and initiated plans for a new building around 1920. The original building was sold and the site of the current Holy Trinity Cathedral, at Third South and Second West, was acquired. The church cornerstone was laid August 23, 1923, the first service was conducted on August 13, 1924, and the new edifice was consecrated on August 2, 1925, after the mortgage had been paid.

The church's Byzantine architecture was unusual for the region. Design was by a local architecture firm, Pope and Burton, in collaboration with a Greek architect from Chicago, N. A. Dokas. N. A. Dokas also built another similar Greek Orthodox Church in Chicago, Annunciation Greek Orthodox Cathedral (Chicago)

Holy Trinity was elevated to the status of a cathedral in 1968 during a visit by Archbishop Iakovos, primate of the Greek Orthodox Archdiocese of America.

Holy Trinity Cathedral underwent a major renovation between 1997 and 2005, at a cost of $4.2 million.

== Hellenic Cultural Museum ==
The lower level of the building houses the Hellenic Cultural Museum, opened in 1992. The museum's exhibits focus on the early history of Greek immigration and immigrant life in Utah and the Salt Lake Valley.

== See also ==
- National Register of Historic Places listings in Salt Lake City
- Buildings and sites of Salt Lake City
