= Jackson Square (Salt Lake City) =

Neighborhood in Salt Lake City, Utah, United States

Coordinates: 40.744°N 111.885°W

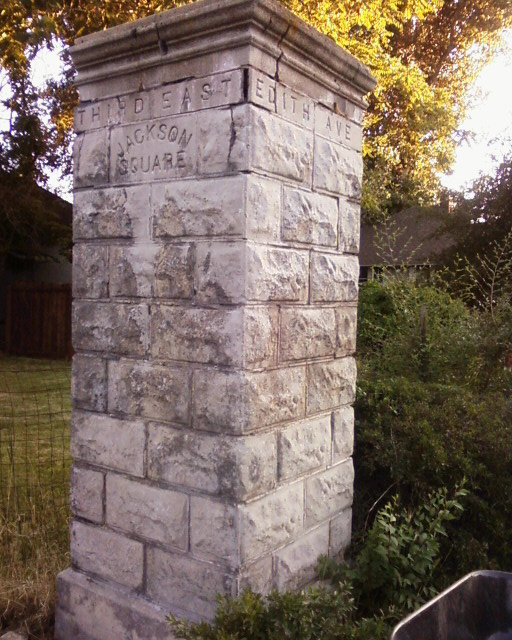
Jackson Square (Salt Lake City), Pillar on 300 East and Edith Avenue

Jackson Square is an early subdivision of Salt Lake City, Utah developed by Kimball and Richards Land Merchants in 1909. The neighborhood's boundaries are 200 East, 300 East, and what was then described as 9th South and 10th South. The streets include Hampton Avenue, Kelsey Avenue, and Edith Avenue (today's 1130 South, 1165 South and 1205 South, respectively).

== Kimball and Richards Land Merchants ==
From 1900 to 1910, the population of Salt Lake grew 73%. By 1930, the population had nearly tripled from the 1900 number, a growth attributed to the development of nearby copper mines. Indeed, Kimball and Richards specifically targeted coal camps in advertising at least one of their developments.

Kimball and Richards' company incorporated in 1908 to "engage in real estate and investment business." D. Carlos Kimball was President, Stephen L. Richards, Vice-President, and Claude Richards, Secretary and Treasurer. The company was the largest early developer in the city, and boasted the introduction of installment plans for property purchasing in the Mountain West. Kimball and Richards was responsible for more than 30 subdivisions between 1900 and 1925, including Highland Park (1909), Jackson Square (1909), Yalecrest, (1913-1914), and Gilmer Park (1919) They also had additional investment and interest in other Utah counties as well as Idaho.

== Original Costs and Amenities ==
Kimball and Richards advertised Jackson Square as a sound investment, declaring it "the cheapest home site property in the city," that offered the opportunity to double the money "before the expiration of your payment contract." Cost for a lot was listed at $500 and up (though by July, the price had dropped to $475 and up), and the firm offered payment terms of $15 down and $15 a month. The neighborhood was praised as being a convenient walking distance to the urban center while still being "away from the rustle and bustle, dirt and smoke of the city." Other amenities included water mains, nearby city electricity, cement curbing and walks, excellent soil for gardening, and "Corner stone monuments that add tone and distinction to the subdivision."

== Corner Stone Monuments ==
Based on sketches and photographic evidence, the Jackson Square development once included 12-18 stone monuments which stood on each corner of the neighborhood. In 1909, Shipler Commercial Photographs captured images of Kimball and Richards workers clearing earth and building the stone monuments, including in the Jackson Square subdivision. These photos were also used in newspapers advertisements for Jackson Square.

The stone monuments included embedded Jackson Square name plaques, along with appropriate street name plaques on two sides. They were also capped with orbs. Today, only one monument remains standing; it is on the southwest corner of Edith and 300 East, though the original orb is missing. The base of another pillar can be found on the southeast corner of Hampton and 200 East.

The extant pillar is a PokeStop called "Third East Jackson Square Street Marker" in the popular game Pokémon Go.

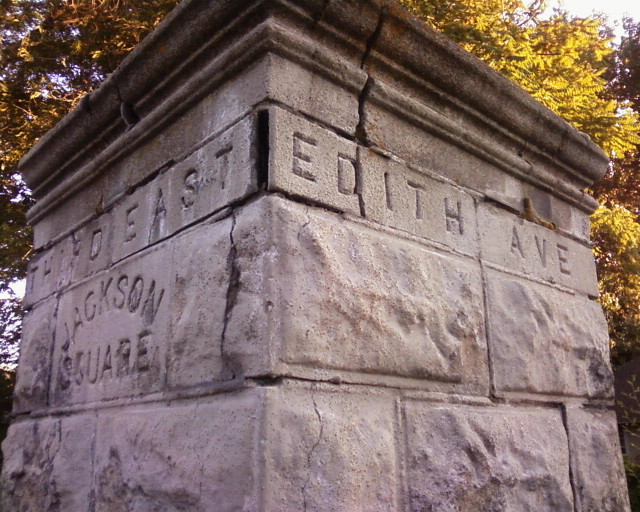
Jackson Square (Salt Lake City), Pillar on 300 East and Edith Avenue
