= Clift Building =

Historic building in Salt Lake City, Utah, U.S.

- U.S. National Register of Historic Places
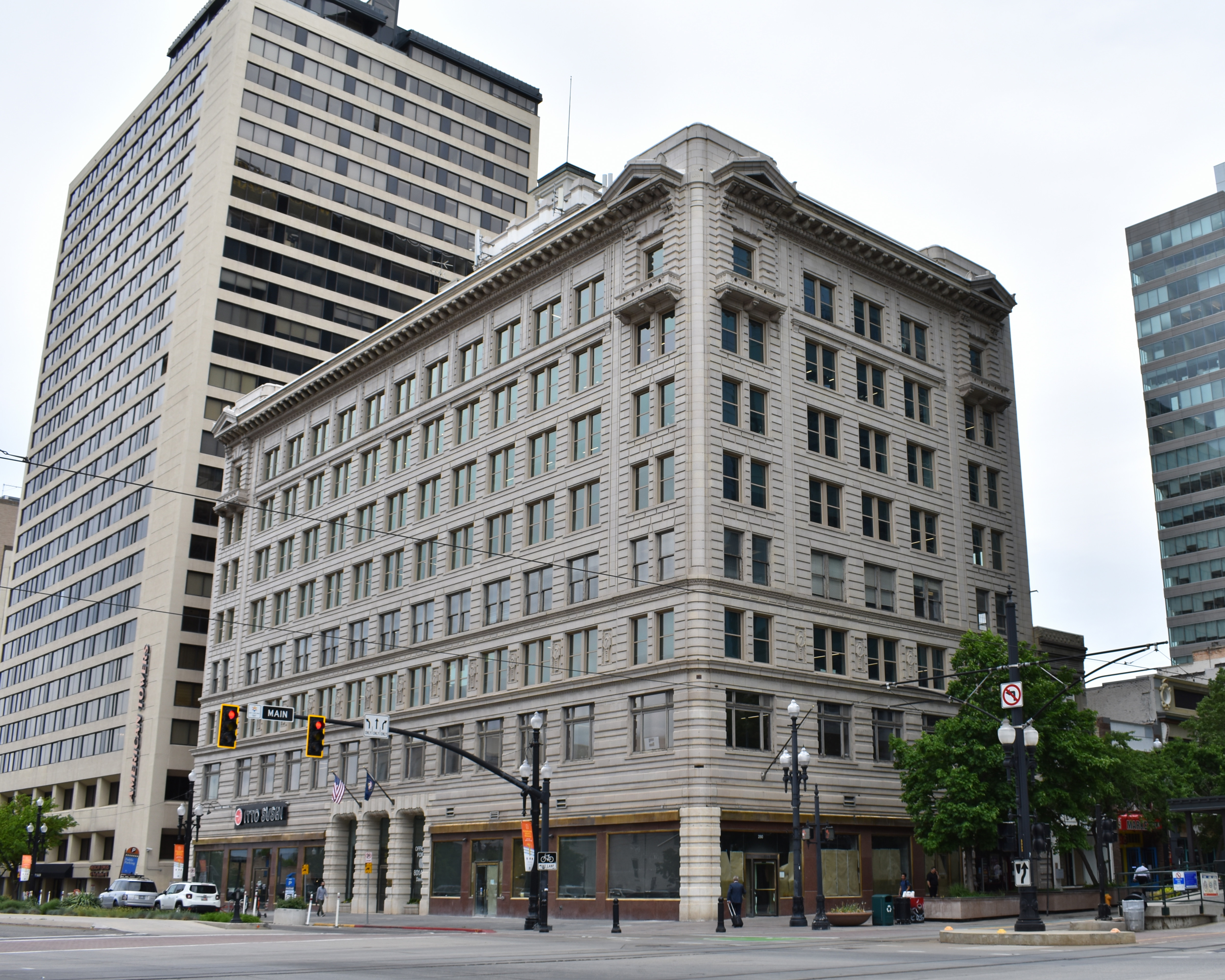
- The Clift Building in 2019

- Location within Utah Location within the United States
- Location: 272 S. Main St., Salt Lake City, Utah
- Coordinates: 40°45′47″N 111°53′27″W
- Area: 0 acres (0 ha)
- Built: 1919
- Built by: Larsen-Sampson Co.
- Architect: Chesebro, James L.
- Architectural style: Late 19th And 20th Century Revivals, Second Renaissance Revival
- MPS: Salt Lake City Business District MRA
- NRHP reference No.: 82004139
- Added to NRHP: August 17, 1982

The Clift Building in Salt Lake City, Utah, is an 8-story commercial office building designed by James L. Chesebro and constructed by the Larsen-Sampson Company in 1919. Chesebro included a theater accessed from the Main Street exposure. The building features a glazed terracotta facade associated with the Second Renaissance Revival style.

Virtue (Butcher) Clift (March 20, 1837 – October 23, 1925) constructed the Clift Building in honor of her late husband, Francis D. Clift (December 7, 1832 – December 21, 1913). The Clifts owned real estate in Salt Lake City, and they had operated a residential hotel, the Clift House, at the future site of the Clift Building.

Francis D. Clift was an 1851 pioneer, opening a mercantile business on Main Street and later investing in the Emma Silver Mine.
