= Utah State Historical Society =

Nonprofit headquartered in Salt Lake City

Utah Historical Society
- Formation: 1897
- Type: Government organization
- Headquarters: 3760 South Highland Dr., Millcreek, UT 84106.
- Region served: Utah
- Website: history.utah.gov

The Utah State Historical Society, founded in 1897, encourages the research, study, and publication of Utah history. From its modest beginnings, the Utah Historical Society has grown to several hundred members, developed a research collection of more than a million items, published more than 300 issues of the Utah Historical Quarterly, led the historic preservation movement in Utah for nearly fifty years, created antiquities and museums programs, and more.

The Society's collection of artifacts and materials related to Utah's history was known for years as The Utah State History Museum. Both the Society and the Museum were located at the Rio Grande Railroad Depot in downtown Salt Lake City beginning in 1980.

The Utah Historical Society collects materials related to the history of Utah, assists communities, agencies, building owners, and consultants with historical resources, administers the ancient human remains program, makes historical resources available in a specialized research library, offers extensive online resources and grants, and assists in public policy and the promotion of Utah's history.

The Utah Historical Society is temporarily housed at 3760 South Highland Dr., Millcreek, UT 84106.

== See also ==
- Museum of Utah
