= Woodruff-Riter-Stewart Home =

Coordinates: 40°46′26″N 111°53′19″W

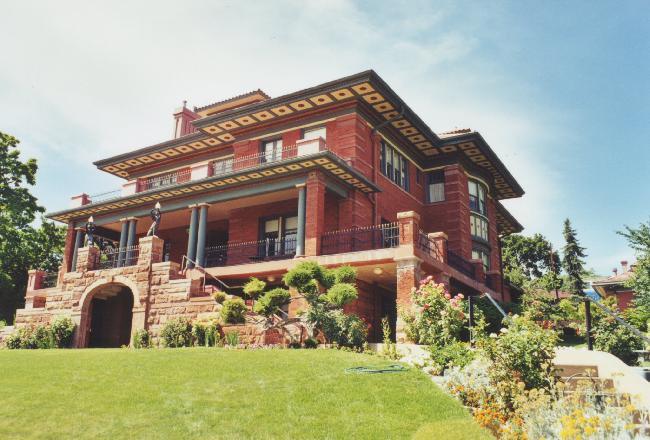
Woodruff-Riter-Stewart Home in 2002.

The Woodruff-Riter-Stewart Home is a mansion on Capitol Hill in Salt Lake City, Utah. It sits on the corner of State Street and 200 North on the south slope of Capitol Hill.

Originally built for Edward D. Woodruff, a Union Pacific doctor who partnered a successful laundry business, the home was designed by architects Headlund and Wood and was finished in 1906. The home is an example of Renaissance architecture.

Originally, the house had an interior like an English home with stained glass, mahogany paneling (although it was cheap local pine painted to resemble mahogany), leather coverings, and mural-adorned walls. However, subsequent owners painted over all of the original interior. Likewise, the original red brick of the house was painted white for a time.

Woodruff lived in the house his entire life and it was inherited by his daughter Leslie and her husband, General Franklin Riter, a noted local citizen. Riter was the first Utah attorney on the Board of the American Bar Association. He was also the US Judge Advocate in Germany. In 1950 the home was sold to DeVirl Stewart. It was a family residence for the Grace Nixon Stewart & Devirl Stewart family from 1950 to 1974. She taught elocution, poise & etiquette classes from her home and also from the McCune mansion for years. After she stopped teaching at the McCune mansion, she taught at BYU for years as well. She led a passionate & interesting life & adds an intriguing spark to the history of this remarkable building. The building was sold in 1950 & for a time it was used for office space, but the building's interior and exterior is now restored. The building was purchased by Philip McCarthey in 2003. The bed and breakfast, Inn on the Hill, was reopened in 2004 and is open daily.
