= Pioneer Park (Salt Lake City) =

Public park in Salt Lake City, Utah, United States

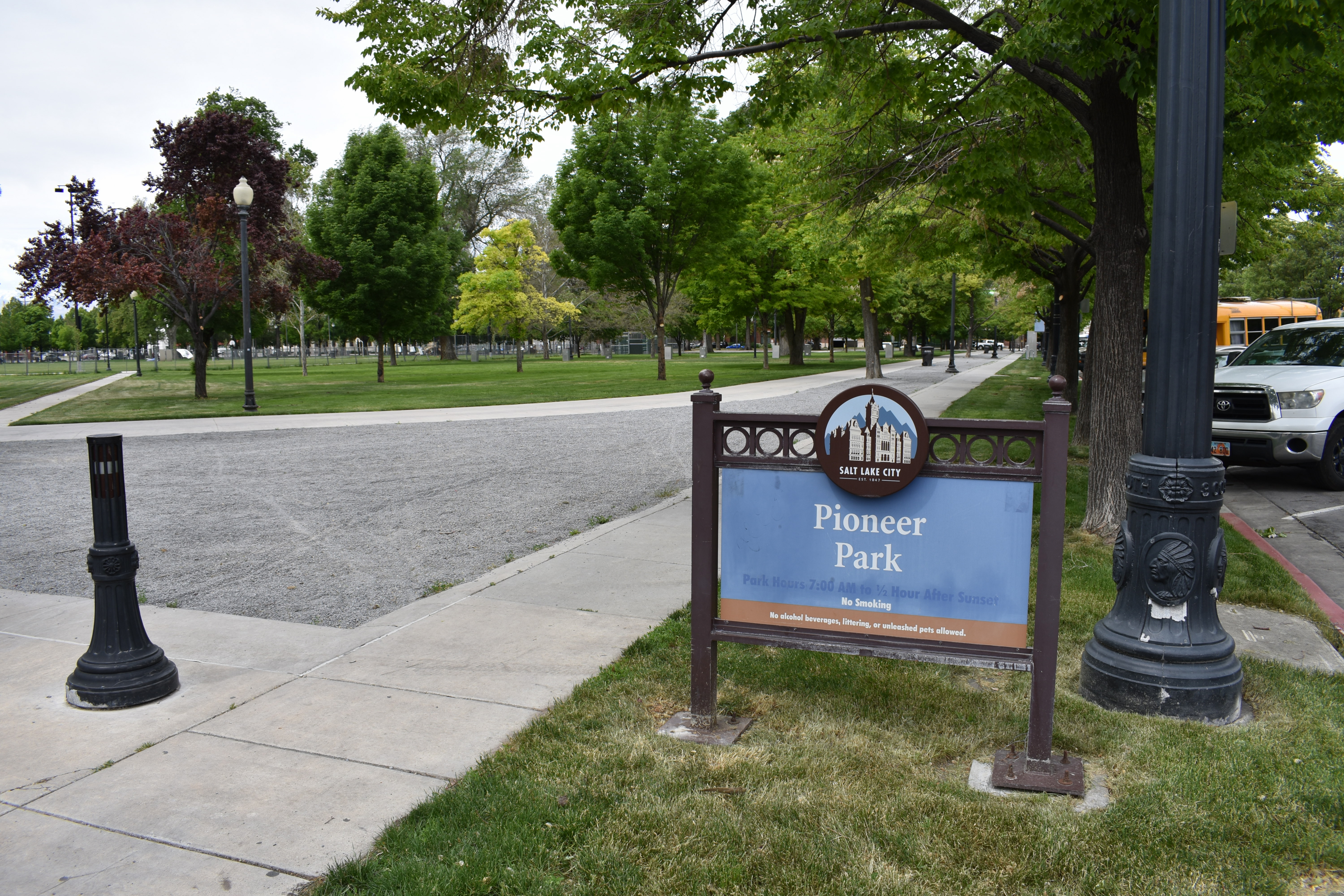
- Pioneer Park and sign, May 2019

- Location within Utah
- Location: 350 South 300 West, Salt Lake City, Utah; United States
- Coordinates: 40°45′42″N 111°54′4″W
- Created: 1847
- Operator: Salt Lake City

Pioneer Park is a public park in Salt Lake City's Rio Grande neighborhood, in the U.S. state of Utah. The site is listed on the National Register of Historic Places as Old Pioneer Fort Site.

The park is the only major green space in downtown Salt Lake City. Founded in 1847, it was the location for the city’s first school, the inaugural general election, and the first General Conference of The Church of Jesus Christ of Latter-Day Saints.

Features include basketball and tennis courts, a dog park, a playground, and a multipurpose field. Pioneer Park also hosts the Downtown Farmers Market.

In February 2026, the city announced that a $20 million renovation would begin in March. The aim is for the north end of Pioneer Park to receive new trees, native plants, walkways, and better lighting. Additionally, a pavilion, a park ranger station, new sports courts, and a new dog park are planned.

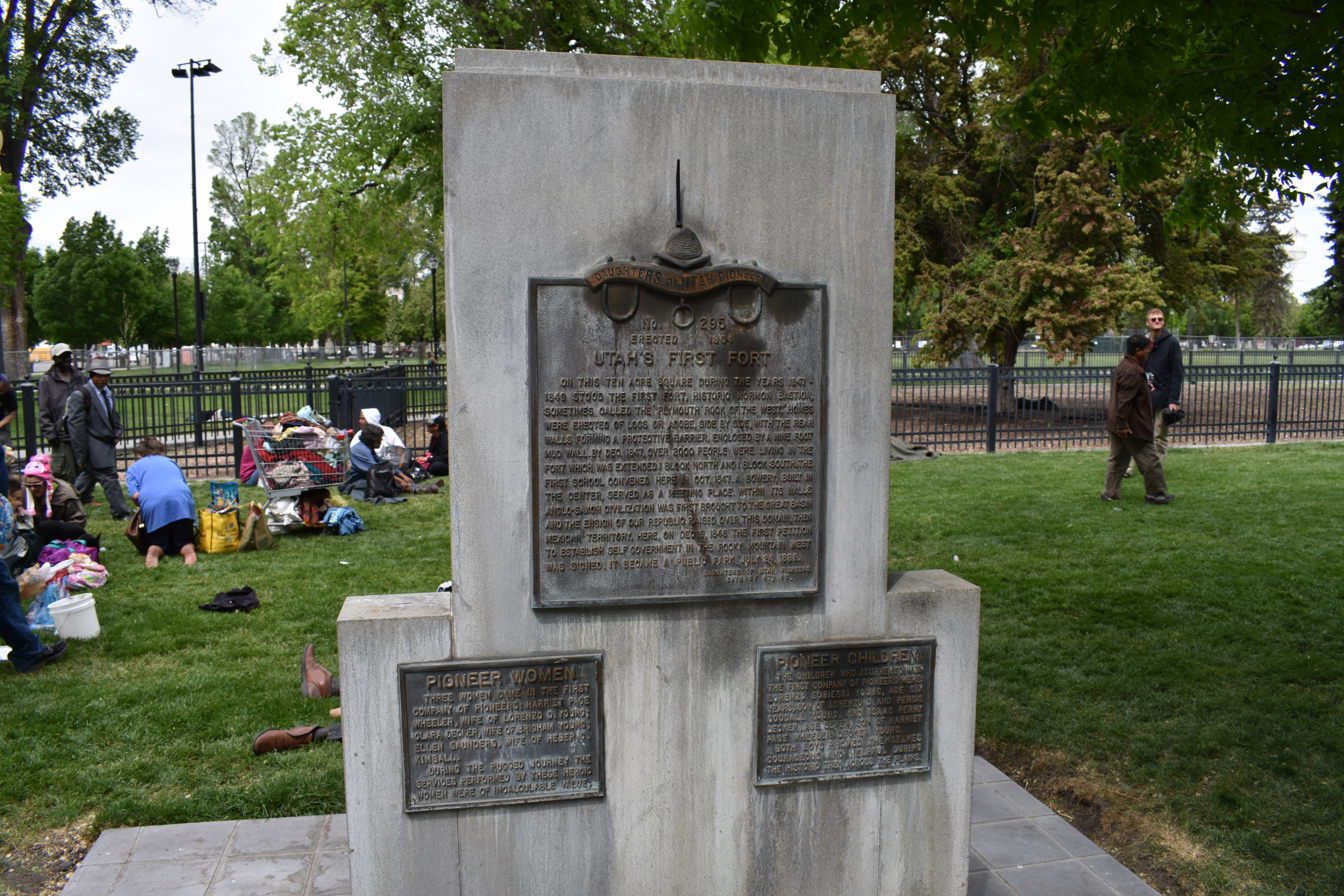
Memorial

== See also ==
- National Register of Historic Places listings in Salt Lake City
