= Capitol Hill, Salt Lake City =

Landmark in Salt Lake City, Utah, United States

Capitol Hill
- Neighborhood of Salt Lake City
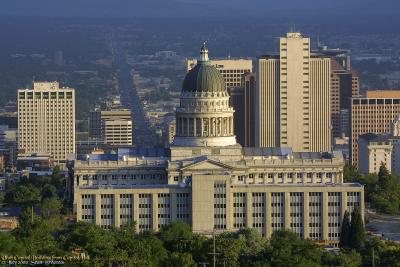
- View of the Utah State Capitol building looking South.
- Interactive map of Capitol Hill
- Country: United States
- State: Utah
- City: Salt Lake City

Area
  - Total: 11.43 sq mi (29.6 km^{2})

Population (2020)
  - Total: 9,015
  - Density: 788.7/sq mi (304.5/km^{2})
- ZIP Codes: 84103, 84116, 84150
- Area code: 801, 385

Capitol Hill is a neighborhood in Salt Lake City, Utah that is defined by the Utah State Capitol.

== Geography ==
The hill slopes down to the south, overlooking downtown Salt Lake City, which is why the Utah State Capitol was built there between 1912 and 1916. State Street (U.S. Route 89 in Utah) leads up Capitol Hill, and Main Street also climbs the one block to the west. The entire Salt Lake City metro area can be seen from Capitol Hill, as can the Great Salt Lake miles to the west.

The hill is home to many historic buildings. The west-sloping side of the hill is a diverse neighborhood called "Marmalade Hill", since the streets are named after various fruits that are often used in making marmalade. The east slope descends sharply into City Creek Canyon. Over the small canyon is another Salt Lake City neighborhood called "the Avenues". Above and to the north of the Capitol building is the Wasatch Springs area named after nearby natural hot springs. The sloping south face of Capitol Hill is sometimes called "Heber's Bench" after Heber C. Kimball, former resident and Apostle of the Church of Jesus Christ of Latter-day Saints.

The Marmalade District's borders are generally considered to be a small triangular area bounded by 300 North on the south, 500 North on the north, Center Street on the east, and Quince Street, the district's "Main Street", on the west.

The Capitol Hill Historic District is listed on the National Register of Historic Places.

== Marmalade District ==
The western slope of Capitol Hill is called the "Marmalade District" after marmalade fruit jam because of the streets named after fruit trees imported and planted there such as apricot, quince and almond. Most of the original streets of Salt Lake City are aligned to and named after cardinal directions, and exceptions to this rule are often named. The Avenues are one example. The irregular, narrow, and steep roads of the Marmalade District are another.

The district is often considered among the most architecturally diverse in Utah residential neighborhoods. Early examples of Utah vernacular architecture sit alongside diverse turn-of-the-century styles such as a Russian-influenced LDS meeting house, Gothic Revival homes, Victorian mansions, and eclectic houses of various combinations of adobe, brick, and carpentry.

== Notable buildings and sites on Capitol Hill ==
- Utah State Capitol
- Salt Lake City Council Hall - old Salt Lake City Hall relocated to the hill from the downtown area.
- White Community Memorial Chapel - 1883 Latter-day Saint 18th ward Gothic Revival chapel that was privately rebuilt across from Capitol building for non-denominational services.
- Pioneer Memorial Museum - flagship museum and headquarters of the Daughters of Utah Pioneers, building façade is a replica of the former Salt Lake Theatre.
- Mormon Battalion Monument - monument to the members of the Mormon Battalion.
- Kimball-Whitney Cemetery - a small cemetery for the Kimball and Whitney families, which is the final resting place of Heber C. Kimball.
- Dickson-Gardner-Wolf Home - large 1905 Classic revival mansion on East Capitol Street for US District Attorney William H. Dickson.
- Alfred McCune Home - 201 North Main Street mansion for Indian-born railroad and mining businessman Alfred W. McCune.
- Ashby Snow Home - 1909 State Street Prairie-Style mansion built for LDS apostle.
- Woodruff-Riter-Stewart Home - 1906 second Renaissance revival State Street mansion.

=== In the Marmalade District ===
- 19th Ward Meetinghouse - Russian-influenced Latter-day Saint (LDS) chapel featuring "onion dome" steeple.
- 19th Ward Relief Society Hall - the last remaining separate LDS Relief Society hall. The 19th Ward Chapel and Relief Society Hall are today the home of the Salt Lake Acting Company, or SLAC, one of two professional theatre companies in Utah.
- John Platts Home - a very early 1856 vernacular adobe house with an 1860 fired brick second story added when bricks first became available in Utah. (NRHP-listed)
- Morrow-Taylor Home – c. 1868 Victorian Italiante home once allegedly the residence of LDS church president John Taylor while evading federal authorities.
- Richard Vaughen Morris Home - 1860s adobe house of Nauvoo Legionnaire Richard Vaughen Morris. (NRHP-listed)
- Thomas Quayle Home - 1884 Gothic Revival mansion relocated in 1975 from downtown.

=== Also of note ===
- Memory Grove – A park dedicated in 1920 to the victims of World War I. Memory Grove is in a small canyon immediately east of Capitol Hill.

== Culture ==
=== Events ===
From June to August each year, the Capitol Preservation Board presents "Movie Under the Stars." This is an outdoor movie series that shows different types of movies. In previous years movies such as Kung Fu Panda; My Big, Fat, Greek Wedding; Shrek the Third; Ant Bully; Iron Man; and Bedtime Stories have been shown. The movies are projected on an inflated movie screen on the south lawn of Capitol Building.

During the summer the Capitol Preservation Board also hosts Capitol Discovery Day. A day to visit and tour the State Capitol Building and enjoy games and activities. Throughout the day bands play and choirs sing inside.
