= Yalecrest =

Neighborhood in Salt Lake City

- U.S. National Register of Historic Places
- Location within Utah Location within the United States
- Location: Roughly bounded by Sunnyside Ave to 1300 South, 1300 East to 1900 East, Salt Lake City, Utah
- Built: Approx 1910-1950
- Architect: Multiple
- Architectural style: Late 19th and 20th Century Revivals -Primarily English Tudor, English Cottage
- NRHP reference No.: 07001168
- Added to NRHP: November 8, 2007

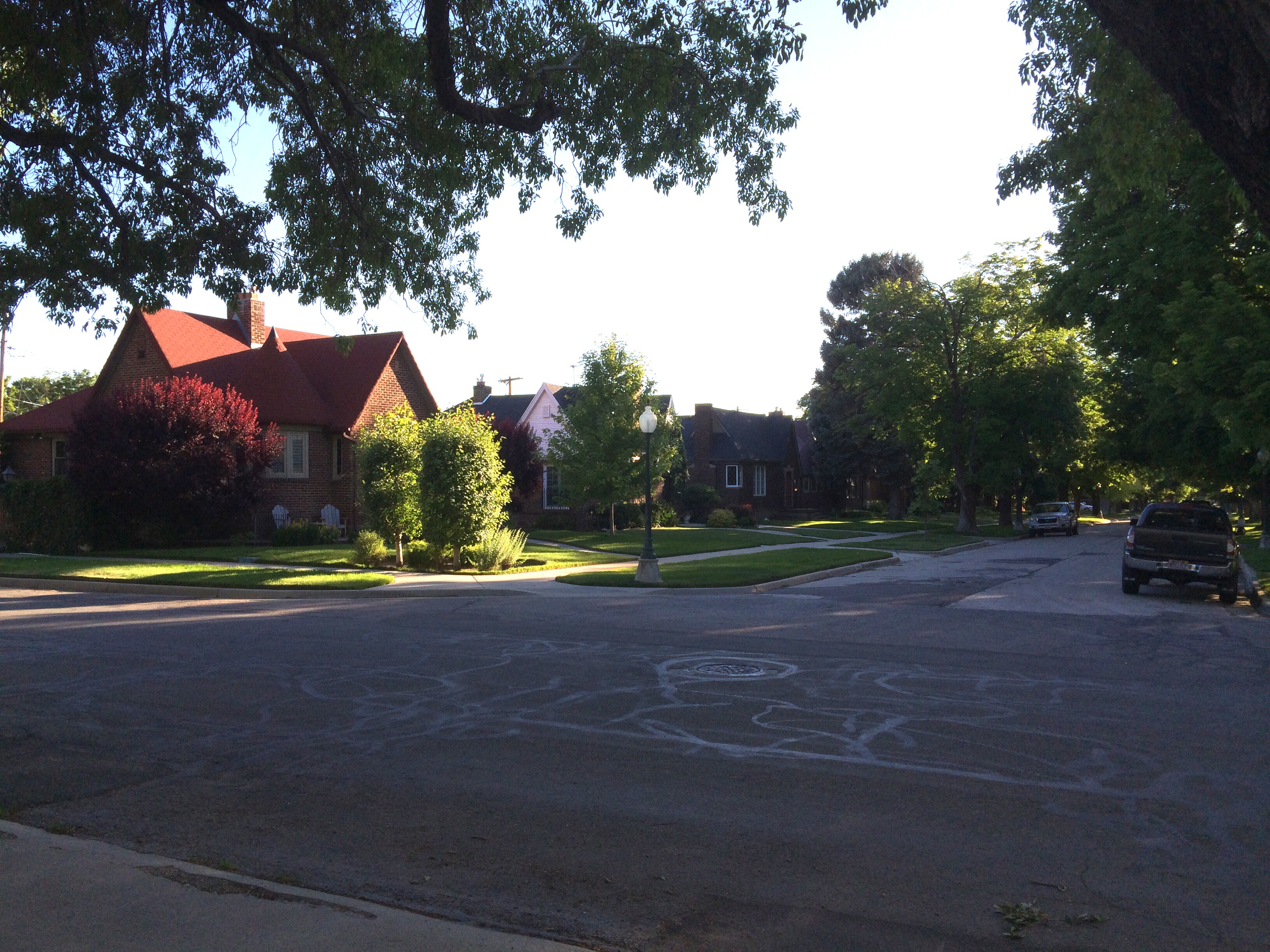
Yalecrest - Harvard Avenue

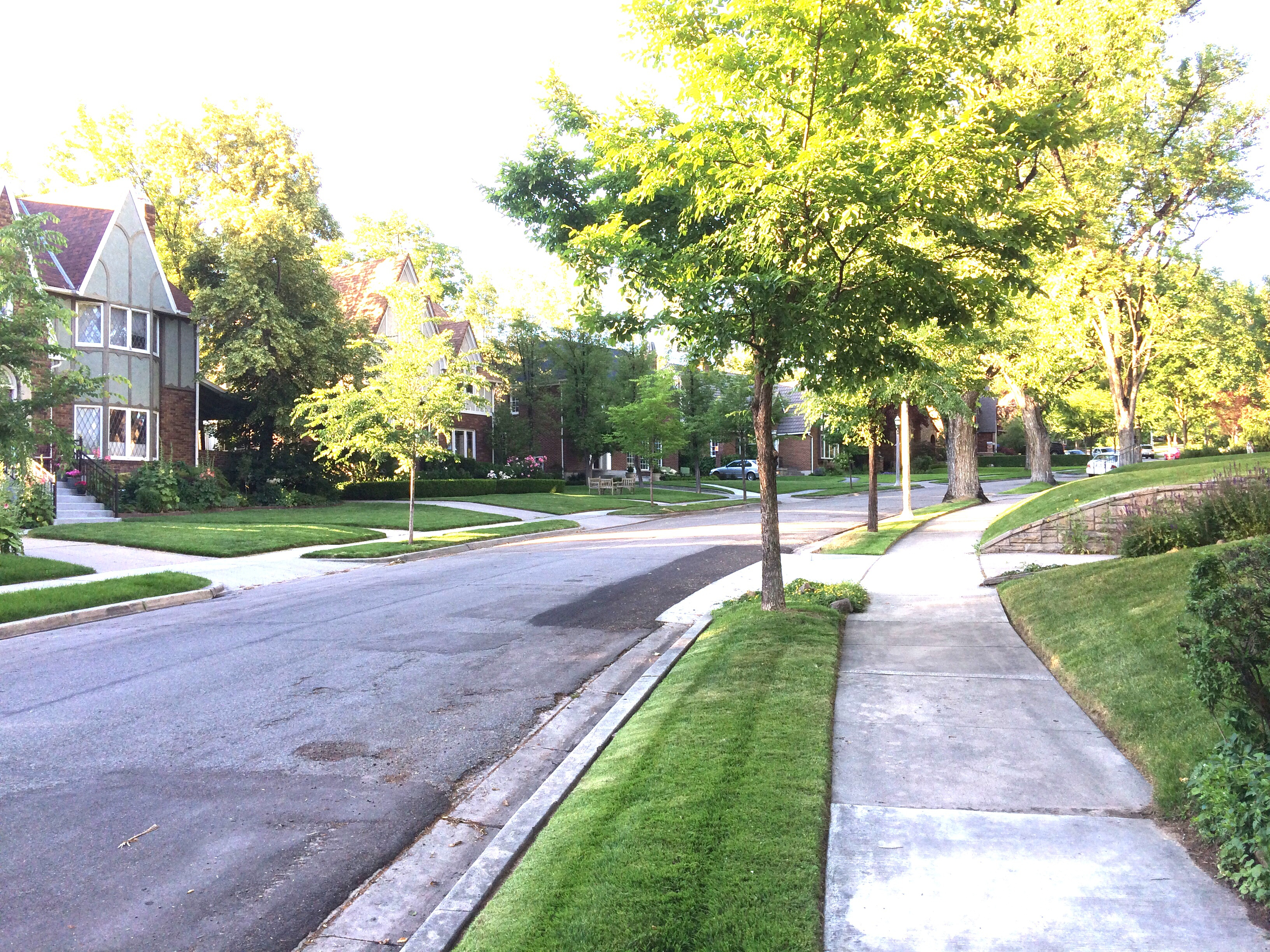
Yalecrest - Princeton Avenue

Yalecrest National Historic District Map

Yalecrest is a residential neighborhood located on the East Bench of Salt Lake City. It runs south from Sunnyside Avenue to 1300 South and east from 1300 East to 1900 East. Yalecrest is commonly referred to as the "Harvard-Yale area" and several streets are named after Ivy League universities. The earliest Yalecrest homes were built in the 1910s, with the vast majority built during the period of 1920–1940. The remaining homes in the easternmost part of the neighborhood were built during the post war boom; much of this development followed the area's being green-lined for use by upper-class whites during the 1930s. Yalecrest has been on the National Register of Historic Places since November 8, 2007.

== Geography and Distinguishing Features ==
A portion of Red Butte Creek passes through several properties, as well as through Miller Park. The area also encloses three churches belonging to the Church of Jesus Christ of Latter-day Saints (LDS Church), three commercial buildings, one school and two parks.

Architecture favors English Cottage, English Tudor, French Norman and Spanish Colonial. One home in the neighborhood, the George Albert Smith home at 1302 Yale Avenue, is listed on the National Register since 1993.

== History ==
The property that is now Yalecrest was distributed by the LDS church authorities by lot for use in raising crops and farming. Dividing the plots for land speculation was discouraged. The earliest identified residents in the Yalecrest area begin to appear in the 1870s. A ten-acre plot belonging to Gutliffe Beck was located near Yalecrest between 1700 and 1800 East. His early 1870s adobe farmstead was located near the intersection of Yalecrest Avenue and 1700 East. The property was later used as a dairy farm. Paul Schettler's farm, situated near the intersection of 1900 East and Herbert Avenue had crops that included silk worms and mulberry orchards. David Lawrence had twenty acres of alfalfa located to the south of the Schettlers. On Sunnyside between 1800 and 1900 East, Jim Carrigan built a house c. 1876 and farmed forty-five acres. A one-legged man named Wheeler lived at what is now 1372 Harvard and got his culinary water from Red Butte Creek. No remnants of these early homes are known to remain.

A number of factors contributed to the Yalecrest area's development in the early twentieth century. The population of Salt Lake City increased rapidly at the turn of the century, almost doubling from 1900 to 1910. After air pollution from coal-burning furnaces as well as early industry in the valley added to the smoke-filled air of Salt Lake City, particularly in the winter, properties on the east bench above the steep grade that flattens at 1300 East above the smoky air of the city began to look attractive for residential development. Land developers began to purchase land on the east bench and early subdivision advertising touted the clean air of the bench, above the smoke of the valley. The first home built in Yalecrest was at 882 South 1400 East in 1912. Transportation options made the Yalecrest area easily accessible to the downtown area. The primary means of transportation in the early part of this era was the streetcar and the line along 1500 East serviced Yalecrest commuters to downtown Salt Lake City. The streetcars serving the Yalecrest area traveled from downtown to 1300 East in front of East High School, south along 900 South to 1500 East, then south to Sugar House and the prison.

The greenlined area that comprises what is now "Yalecrest" is sketchily visible as "A2" in this map of Salt Lake City's redlined and green-lined areas.

The Yalecrest neighborhood almost exactly comprises the green-lined zone "A2" on the U.S. Federal Government Home Owners' Loan Corporation's development map for Salt Lake City, which marks the area as "undeveloped, but [...] potentially a high-class residential section." This designation stimulated disproportionate investment in the principally white, upper-class, and Mormon neighborhood in the near-century that followed.

== Notable residents ==
- Charles R. Mabey - Utah House of Representatives 1913 - 1915, 5th Governor of Utah 1921-1925
- William C. Ray - Democratic Candidate for the U.S. House of Representatives 1912, U.S. District Attorney
- Gaskell Romney - Builder/Contractor, Regarded as the Father of The Romney U.S. Political Family, Mitt Romney's Grandfather
- Wallace F. Bennett - U.S. Senator from Utah 1950 - 1974
- George Albert Smith - LDS General Authority - 8th Church President May, 1945
- Ezra Taft Benson - U.S. Secretary of Agriculture during Dwight D. Eisenhower Administration, LDS General Authority, and 13th Church President 1985
- Spencer W. Kimball - LDS General Authority - 12th Church President 1974
- Hugh B. Brown - LDS General Authority Apostle of the Quorum of the Twelve 1970 - 1975
- Russell M. Nelson - LDS General Authority Apostle of the Quorum of the Twelve 1984 - 2025
- Joseph B. Wirthlin - LDS General Authority Apostle of the Quorum of the Twelve 1986 - 2008
- Dallin H. Oaks - Professor at the University of Chicago Law School, President of Brigham Young University, Utah Supreme Court Justice, LDS General Authority Apostle of the Quorum of the Twelve 1984 - Current
- Michael O. Leavitt (Mike Leavitt) - 14th Governor of Utah, Administrator of the Environmental Protection Agency 2003 - 2005, Secretary of Health and Human Services 2005 - 2009
- Ty Burrell - Emmy Award Winning Actor Modern Family ABC Network

== Prominent architects ==
- J.C. Craig – House at 1327 E. Michigan Avenue
- Lorenzo Snow Young – Bonneville LDS Ward, House at 1608 E. Michigan
- Glen A. Finlayson – Unusual Art Deco House at 973 Diestel Road
- Slack Winburn – House at 979 South 1300 East – He studied architecture in Toulouse France at The Ecole des Beaux Arts et des Sciences Industrielles
- Fred J. Swaner – House at 871 South 1400 East
- Dan Weggeland – Normandie Heights - 1300 East (E)- 1500 East (W) includes the streets of Harvard, Princeton, Laird, Normandie Circle, Laird Circle and Uintah Circle
- Raymond Ashton – George Albert Smith House at 1302 Yale, Sprague Library
- Walter E. Ware – House at 1607 E. Yalecrest for Charles and Minnie Miller
- Taylor Woolley – Frank Lloyd Wright trained architect and protégé– 1402 Yale Avenue

== Churches ==
- Yale Ward - Colonial Revival chapel designed by Taylor Woolley (a Frank Lloyd Wright trained architect) at Evans and Woolley and built by Gaskell Romney in 1925. Both Woolley and Romney were nearby residents.
- Yalecrest Ward - Art Deco and Moorish Revival chapel at 1035 South 1800 East, completed in 1936.
- Garden Park Ward - Famed early Modern chapel with elements of Tudor Revival and surrounding Moorish gardens. Completed in 1939.
- Bonneville Ward - Postwar Colonial Revival style chapel designed by Lorenzo Snow Young and constructed by the Jacobsen Construction Company in 1949. Built on land previously incorporated into the park, the road now standing between them was originally a private drive owned by the LDS Church.

== Parks ==
- Miller Park - Miller Park follows the course of Red Butte Creek on both sides of its ravine and was originally a 9-acre ravine that extended from 900 South to 1500 East, but now stops at Bonneview Drive as a land swap in 1945 gave the southern section of Miller Park to the LDS Church in exchange for property that became Laird Park. It is located on 1800 East between Laird and Princeton. Miller Park is named for Lee Charles and Minnie Viele Miller that lived at 1607 Yalecrest. After Lee Charles' death in 1930, Minnie Miller donated 2 acres of property in his memory along both sides of Red Butte Creek to the city along with city property and property acquired from the Herrick Construction Company. It became known as the Lee Charles Miller Park.
- Laird Park - Laird Park is located on 1800 East between Laird and Princeton Avenue. It was created in 1945.

== Notable building ==
- Duffin's Grocery Store - Duffin's Grocery Store was built in 1925 at 1604 Princeton and was run by Clarence Duffin in conjunction with William Wood & Sons meat market. Duffin's was the only market within Yalecrest and designed to have the same setback and blend in with the surrounding houses. Duffin's Grocery was renamed Princeton Market before being turned into a hair salon "Princeton Hair Fashions". This property has now been turned into a personal residence.

== Schools ==
- Uintah Elementary School was constructed in 1915 to support the growing elementary school age population of the East Bench. It was built encircled by vacant land but was soon filled to capacity with the rapid growth of the surrounding residential sections. The school was enlarged in 1927 and in 1995 the original school was torn down and a new one built in its place.
