= Capitol Hill Historic District (Salt Lake City) =

Historic district in Salt Lake City, Utah, U.S.

- U.S. National Register of Historic Places
- U.S. Historic district
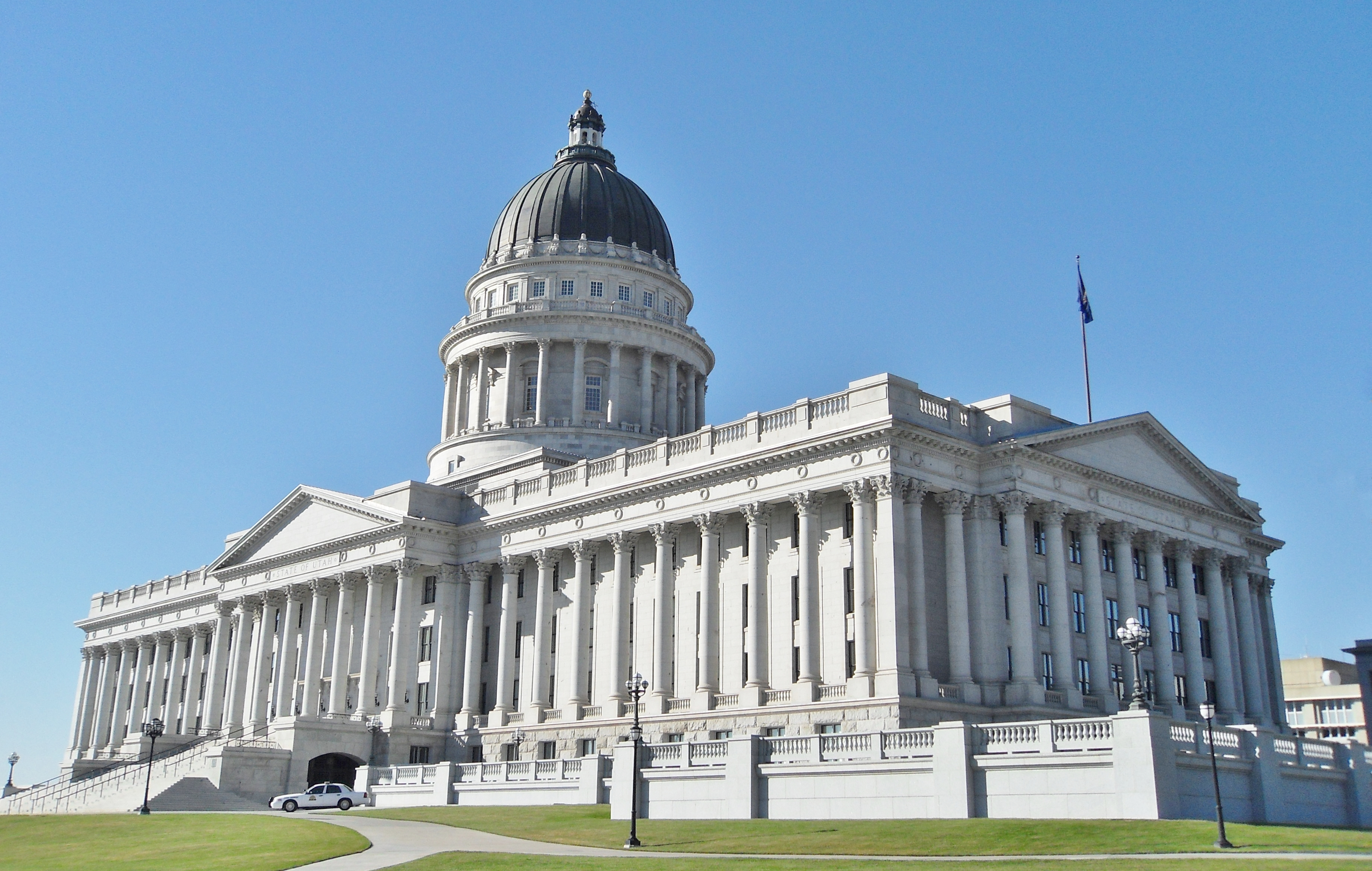
- The Utah State Capitol, sitting at the top of Capitol Hill, for which the historic district is named

- Location within Utah Location within the United States
- Location: Roughly bounded by Beck, Main and Wall Streets, 300 North, Victory Road, and Capitol Boulevard (original) and roughly bounded by 300 North, 400 West, 800 North, Wall Street, and 200 West (increase) in Salt Lake City, Utah; United States
- Coordinates: 40°46′43″N 111°53′33″W
- Built: 1850
- Architect: Multiple
- Architectural style: Mixed (more Than 2 Styles From Different Periods)(original); Mid 19th Century Revival, Late Victorian (increase)
- NRHP reference No.: 82004135 and 01001451
- Added to NRHP: August 2, 1982 (original); January 11, 2002 (increase)

The Capitol Hill Historic District in Salt Lake City, Utah, United States was listed on the National Register of Historic Places in 1982.

== Description ==
The district was originally roughly bounded by Beck, Main and Wall Streets, 300 North, Victory Road, and Capitol Boulevard and includes the Utah State Capitol. The district was increased in 2002 to include an area roughly bounded by 300 North, 400 West, 800 North, Wall Street, and 200 West.

== See also ==
- National Register of Historic Places listings in Salt Lake City
- Capitol Hill (Salt Lake City)
