= Carmike Cinemas =

Former American movie theater chain

Carmike Cinemas, Inc.

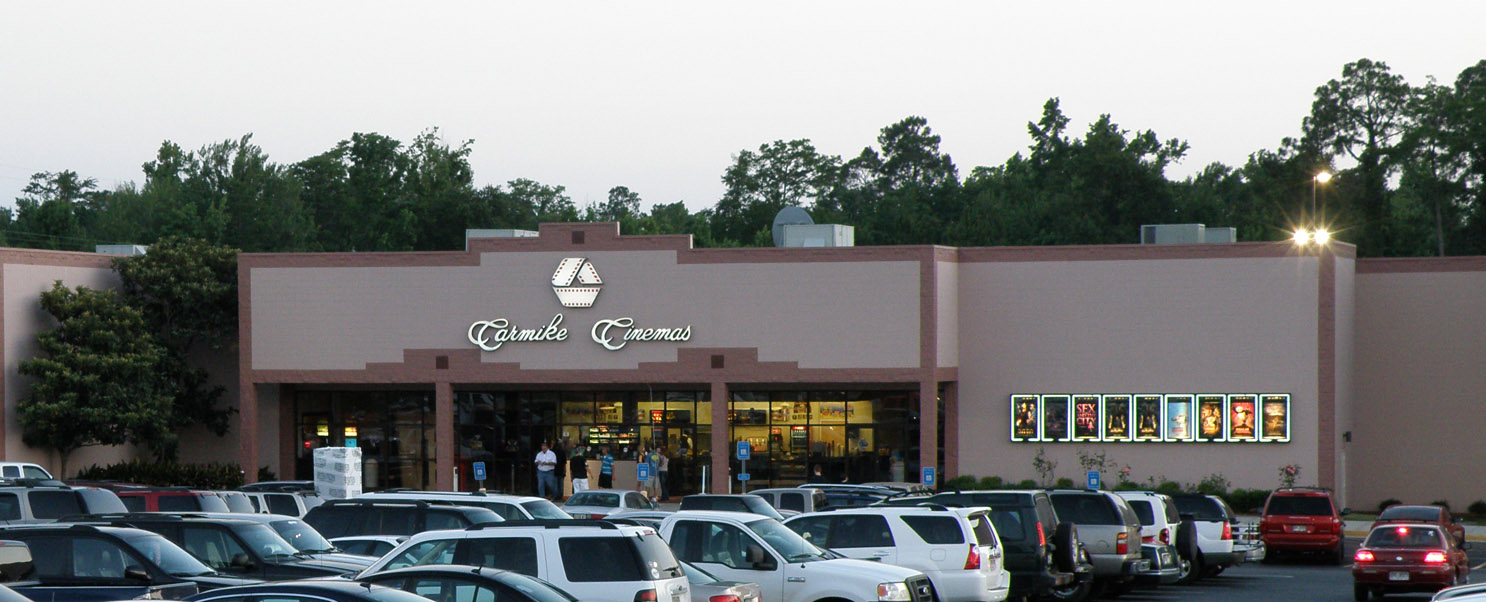
- Carmike movie theater in Statesboro, Georgia
- Type: Subsidiary
- Traded as: Nasdaq: CKEC
- Industry: Entertainment
- Predecessor: Martin Theatres
- Founded: 1982; 44 years ago
- Founder: Carl Patrick, Sr.
- Defunct: December 21, 2016 (corporation); May 2017 (brand)
- Fate: Acquired by AMC Theatres
- Successor: AMC Theatres
- Headquarters: Columbus, Georgia, United States
- Area served: Primarily Rural and suburban areas
- Parent: AMC Entertainment
- Website: amctheatres.com

Carmike Cinemas, Inc. was an American motion picture exhibitor headquartered in Columbus, Georgia. As of March 2016, the company had 276 theaters with 2,954 screens in 41 states, and was the fourth largest movie theater chain in the United States. The company billed itself as "America's Hometown Theatre" and Carmike theaters were largely positioned in rural or suburban areas with populations under 200,000. The company's theaters operated under various names and generally had a name followed by the number of auditoriums at that location; for example, "Carmike 15".

On March 4, 2016, AMC Theatres announced its intent to acquire Carmike Cinemas. The deal was closed on December 21, 2016; Carmike locations were converted to the AMC brand in 2017, with the Carmike logo and slogan being repurposed for the new AMC Classic banner (which was adopted by smaller AMC locations with fewer premium amenities).

== History ==
Carmike was founded when Carl L. Patrick, Sr. acquired Martin Theatres from Fuqua Industries in 1982. The company's name was derived from a combination of the first names of Carl L. Patrick, Sr.'s two sons, Carl Jr. and Michael, hence "Carmike".

In 1996, Carmike purchased Fox Theatres Corp. (which had 61 screens in their chain), and Maxi Saver Cinemas (which had 18 screens in their chain), both primarily in Pennsylvania. In 1997, Carmike partnered with Walmart to start the Hollywood Connection, starting with a location in Columbus, Georgia. Amenities include a modern multiplex or megaplex movie theater with 5–15 screens, indoor miniature golf, a roller skating rink, a laser tag arena, and a video game arcade. At the time, Carmike was wanting this field to be extremely profitable. While the Columbus, Georgia location is still open, other locations in West Valley City, Utah (a suburb of Salt Lake City), DeKalb, Illinois, Valparaiso, Indiana (a suburb of Chicago), and Goshen, Indiana have closed.

Carmike filed for Chapter 11 bankruptcy protection in August 2000 after failing to make US$9 million in interest payments to bondholders—the company owed approximately US$650 million in debt. Since declaring bankruptcy, many theaters (mostly smaller single, twin and triple theatres) in inactive markets were closed down, and some were renovated or relocated in areas with desirable market potential—most of these newer theaters are 10 screens or larger. The number of theaters owned or operated by the company dropped from 448 to just over 300.

During bankruptcy, the company was forced to sell or close several historic theaters, including the Villa Theatre in Salt Lake City, Utah and the Indian Hills Theater in Omaha, Nebraska, the latter of which contained a 70-foot (21 m) wide Cinerama screen, believed to be the largest in the US at the time. The Indian Hills was eventually demolished in August 2001 by its new owners, Methodist Health System, and replaced with a parking lot for the system's nearby hospital and nursing college. Actress Patricia Neal called the destruction of the theater "a crime" in a letter of support, and letters were also written by Kirk Douglas, Janet Leigh, Robert Wise and film critic Leonard Maltin.

Carmike exited bankruptcy in January 2002, having successfully restructured its debts and operations. A judge approved the Chapter 11 plan, filed in October 2001, which involved payment of US$263 million of Carmike's bank loans.

In 2005, Carmike purchased 30 GKC Theaters (263 screens) from Beth Kerasotes (the heir of George Kerasotes) for $66 million. The George Kerasotes Corporation was the result of a split with other family members who jointly owned Kerasotes Theatres. In December 2008, Mark Cuban acquired a 9.4 percent stake in Carmike Cinemas and, following a Securities and Exchange Commission (SEC) filing, Cuban explained that his interest was for investment purposes.

Carmike Cinemas' board of directors removed Michael Patrick as its chief executive on January 20, 2009. S. David Passman III was selected as the non-executive chairman of the board. The board established an Office of the Chairman as a body that oversaw the company's strategic direction and the transitional period until a new chief executive was employed—in addition to Passman, the Office of the Chairman consisted of chief operating officer Fred Van Noy and chief financial officer Richard Hare. On June 4, 2009, the company announced that S. David Passman III was appointed president and chief executive officer, while board member, Roland C. Smith, succeeded Passman as Carmike's chairman of the board. Van Noy and Hare remained in their respective positions.

In 2011, Carmike Cinemas acquired MNM Theatres, adding three locations (40 screens) in the Atlanta area. In October 2012, Rave Cinemas, a division of Cinemark Theatres, signed an agreement to sell 16 theaters with 251 screens to Carmike Cinemas for $19 million in cash and $100.4 million of assumed lease obligations. Of the 16 theaters being acquired, six are in Alabama, four in Florida, two in Indiana, and one each in Illinois, Pennsylvania, Tennessee and Texas. This was Carmike's first foray into IMAX. The sale also included 7 IMAX screens. Before the sale Rave owned or managed 62 theaters and 939 screens located in 21 states across the country.

On July 18, 2013, Carmike Cinemas announced that they would buy three more theatres from Rave Cinemas located in Louisville, Kentucky; Voorhees, New Jersey; and Hickory Creek, Texas. With this change, the Voorhees and Louisville locations switched to Screenvision from National CineMedia, while Hickory Creek remains with Screenvision. The sale also included an eighth IMAX screen. The sale was closed on August 16, 2013.

On November 4, 2013, Carmike Cinemas purchased Muvico Theaters for just under $31.8 million in an acquisition that included Muvico's nine locations in Florida, California and Illinois. Two Bogart's restaurants were also included in the sale and, after the sale closed at the end of 2013, the MuviXL screens was rebranded as "Carmike's BigD". Carmike's first-ever California location, the Thousand Oaks 14 theater, was obtained in the acquisition.

On May 15, 2014, Carmike Cinemas announced their purchase of Digital Cinema Destinations Corp., operating as Digiplex Destinations, in an all-stock transaction. Included in the deal were Digiplex's 21 open locations containing 206 screens, as well as 5 theaters in development with an additional 53 screens. The acquisition introduced Carmike to 4 new states: Arizona, Connecticut, Maryland, and New Hampshire.

On October 6, 2015, Carmike Cinemas announced it agreed to acquire the Sundance Group's cinema chain, Sundance Cinemas, for $36 million.

On March 3, 2016, AMC Theatres announced its intent to acquire Carmike Cinemas in a $1.1 billion deal, subject to regulatory and shareholder approval. The deal was completed on December 21, 2016. With the deal, AMC overtook Regal Entertainment Group as the United States' largest movie theater chain.

In February 2017, AMC announced it would discontinue the Carmike name and re-brand all of its locations under either the AMC, AMC Classic, or AMC Dine-in banner. Most of Carmike's former locations were converted to the AMC Classic banner, which denotes smaller locations with fewer premium amenities than the AMC and AMC Dine-In banners. Upon the change in banner, some locations also switched formats from second-run to first-run films, whilst maintaining lower ticket prices than competitors. The AMC Classic banner uses Carmike's trademarks, including the folded film logo and "America's Hometown Theatres" slogan.
