= 19th Ward Meetinghouse and Relief Society Hall =

Historic building in Salt Lake City, Utah, U.S.

- U.S. National Register of Historic Places
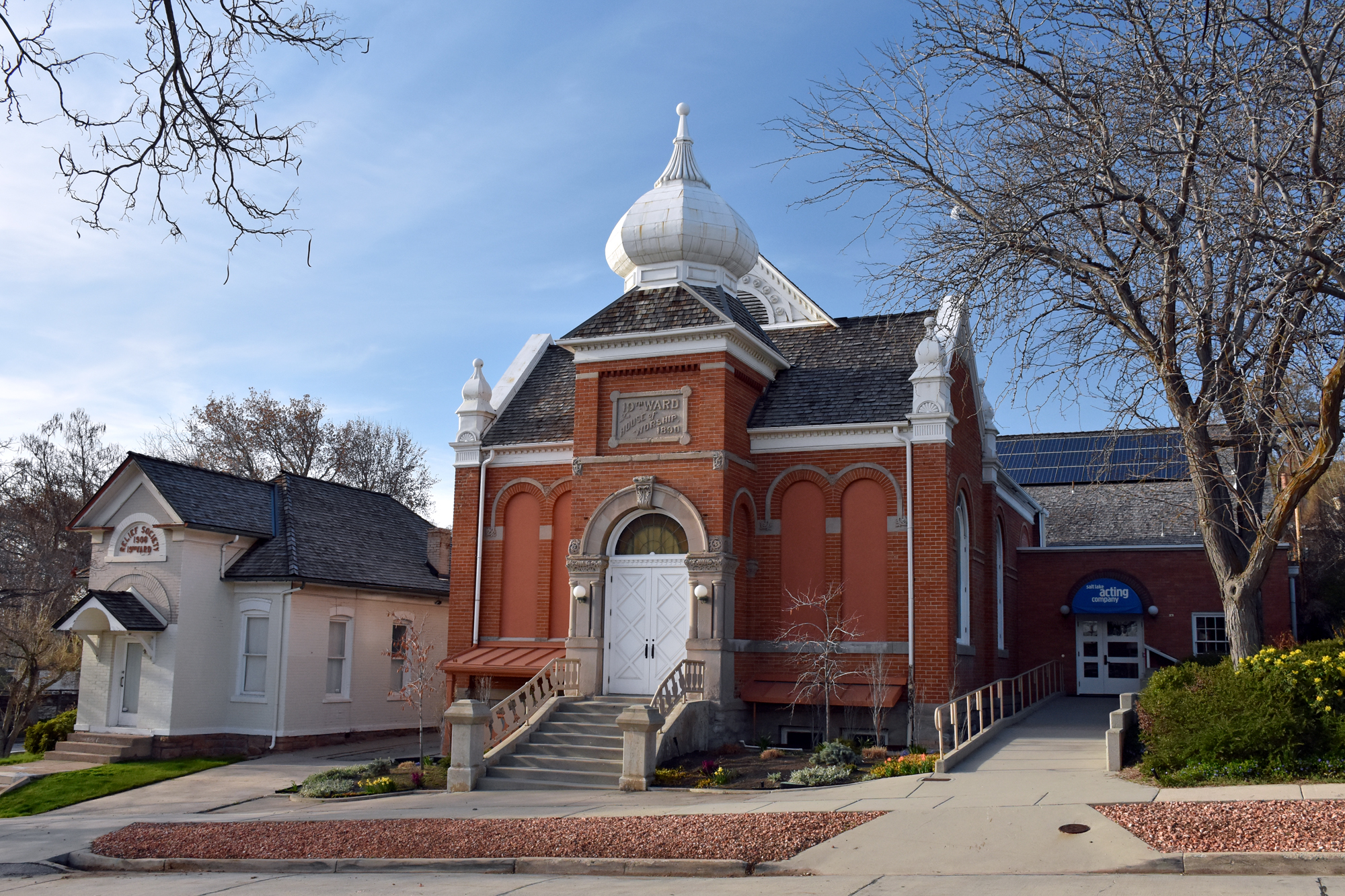
- Both buildings in 2019

- Location within Utah Location within the United States
- Location: 168 W. 500 North, Salt Lake City, Utah
- Coordinates: 40°46′49.5″N 111°53′45.1″W
- Area: less than one acre
- Built: 1890
- Architect: Bowman, Robert
- NRHP reference No.: 76001820
- Added to NRHP: May 28, 1976

The 19th Ward Meetinghouse and Relief Society Hall, at 168 W. 500 North, Salt Lake City, Utah, was listed on the National Register of Historic Places in 1976.

It was built in 1896. Its architecture is significant in American history as reflecting changes imposed upon the Church of Jesus Christ of Latter-day Saints (LDS Church) by outside influences. Pressure included various Federal enforcement efforts following upon the Edmunds–Tucker Act of 1877, which outlawed polygamy. In effect, the LDS Church capitulated, and sought to adopt different values in conformity with worldwide ones. The meetinghouse was designed by architect Robert Bowman and represented a "totally out of character" change in style; it includes an "oriental, Byzantine, or German Renaissance-inspired onion dome". It was no longer a church when listed on the National Register of Historic Places in 1976.

The building currently houses Salt Lake Acting Company.
