= Brigham Young Historic Park =

Park in Salt Lake City, Utah

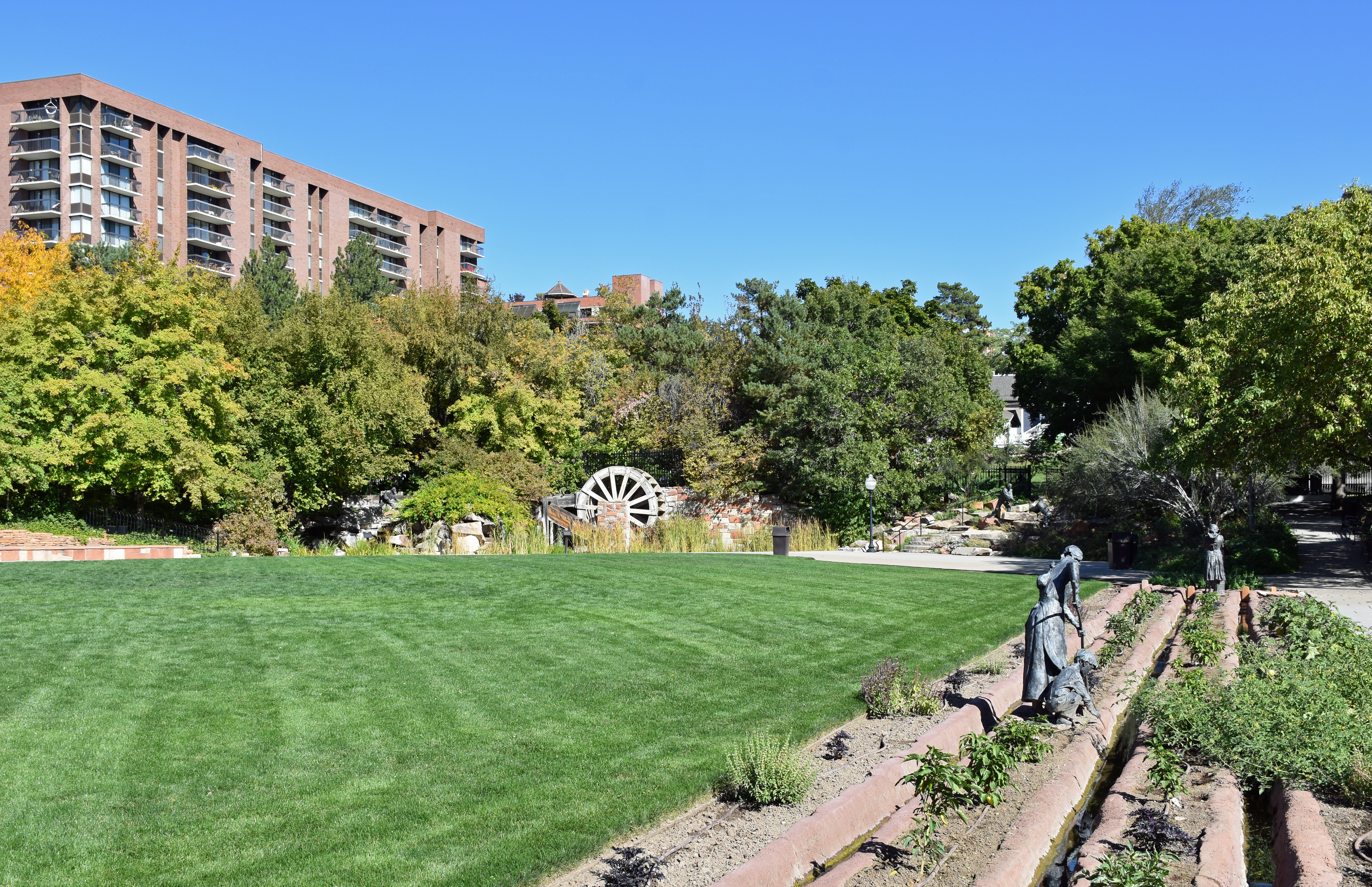
- The park in September 2024
- Interactive map of Brigham Young Historic Park
- Location: Salt Lake City, Utah, United States
- Coordinates: 40°46′16.8″N 111°53′16.31″W
- Area: 1 acre (0.40 ha)
- Opened: October 2, 1995
- Designer: Leonard Grassli; Scott Van Dyke
- Owner: The Church of Jesus Christ of Latter-day Saints
- Status: Open spring thru fall (weather permitting)

Brigham Young Historic Park is a park near Temple Square in Salt Lake City, Utah, United States. Built in 1995, along with its companion park, City Creek Park, it was created to provide additional urban green space in the downtown area. The park honors Brigham Young and the industry of the Mormon pioneers and includes several sculptures depicting pioneering efforts. The property originally belonged to Young's brother, Lorenzo Dow Young.

== Features ==
The park includes a large, central grassy area. It also features a small stage, several pieces of artwork, and water features furnished by City Creek, a stream which flows out of a nearby canyon. Also included is a preserved section of the wall which once surrounded Brigham Young's estate. The park also has a plaque which commemorates the American Institute of Certified Planners designating Joseph Smith's Plat of Zion a National Historic Planning Landmark in 1996.

=== City Creek ===
A major feature of both City Creek Park and the Brigham Young Historic Park is a daylit portion of City Creek, an important water source for the natural flora and fauna in the area, along with the Indigenous peoples and later the early settlers of Salt Lake City. City Creek had been moved into underground pipes in this area of the city during the early twentieth century and for several decades prior to the creation of the parks, the city has desired to bring it to the surface in select areas of the community.

The daylit portion of the creek begins just south of Memory Grove, its course then flows along the base of the hillside near the historic Ottinger Hall, after which it disappears under roads and reappears in landscaped medians along Canyon Road. It then flows under that road and into City Creek Park before a portion disappears under Second Avenue and reemerges at the Brigham Young Historic Park. Here the water flows in a flume, spilling out onto a large water wheel. The water pools at the base of the wheel, until it flows into furrows with garden crops on either side. At the end of the furrows, the water returns underground.

=== Artwork ===
Four groupings of sculptures by artist Peter M. Fillerup were added to the park in spring 1996. The four groups include: workers repairing a flume, children at play in the water, men working in a stone quarry, and workers planting and harvesting crops.

Peter Fillerup's Pioneer Sculptures

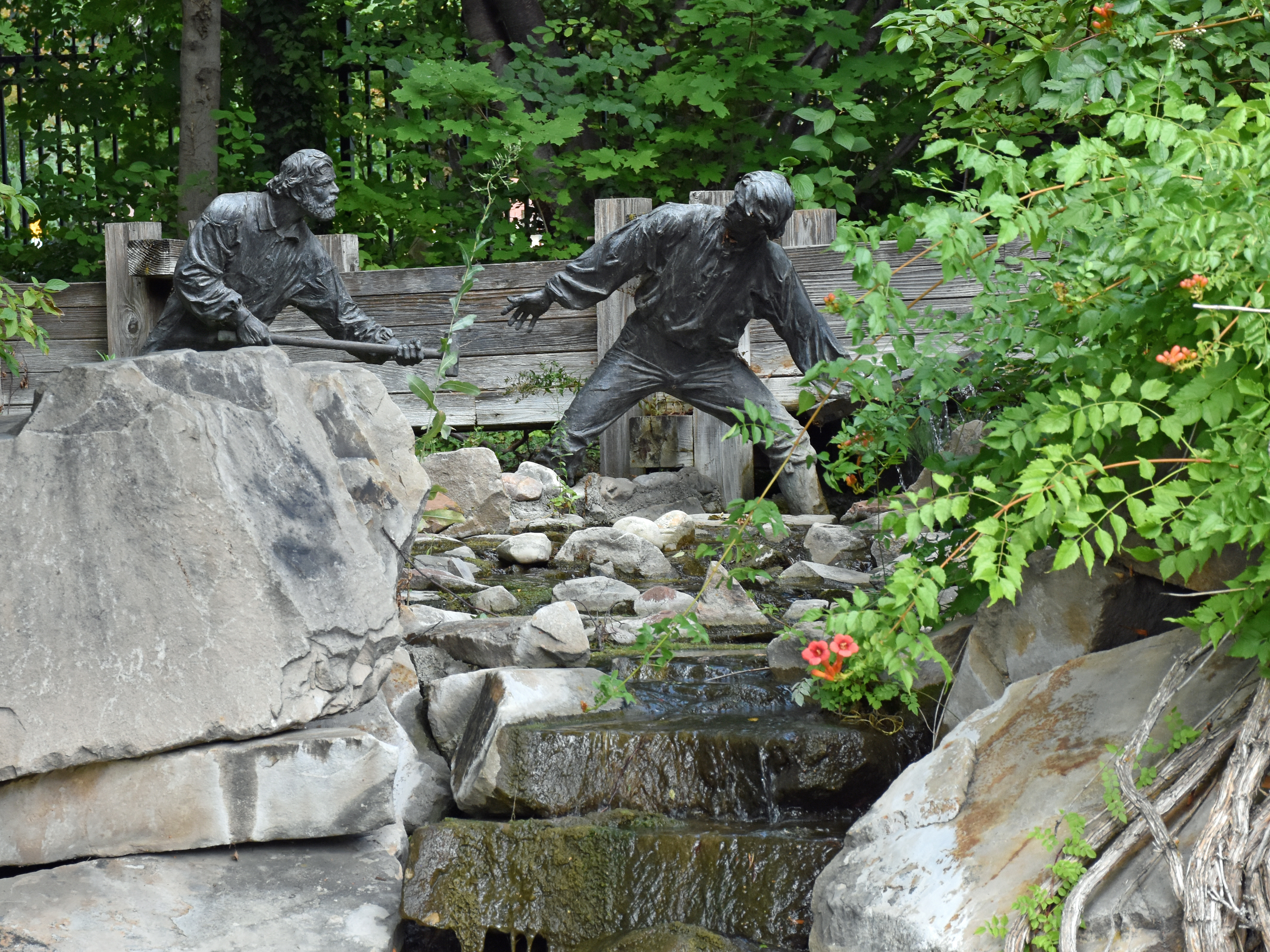
Workers repairing a flume

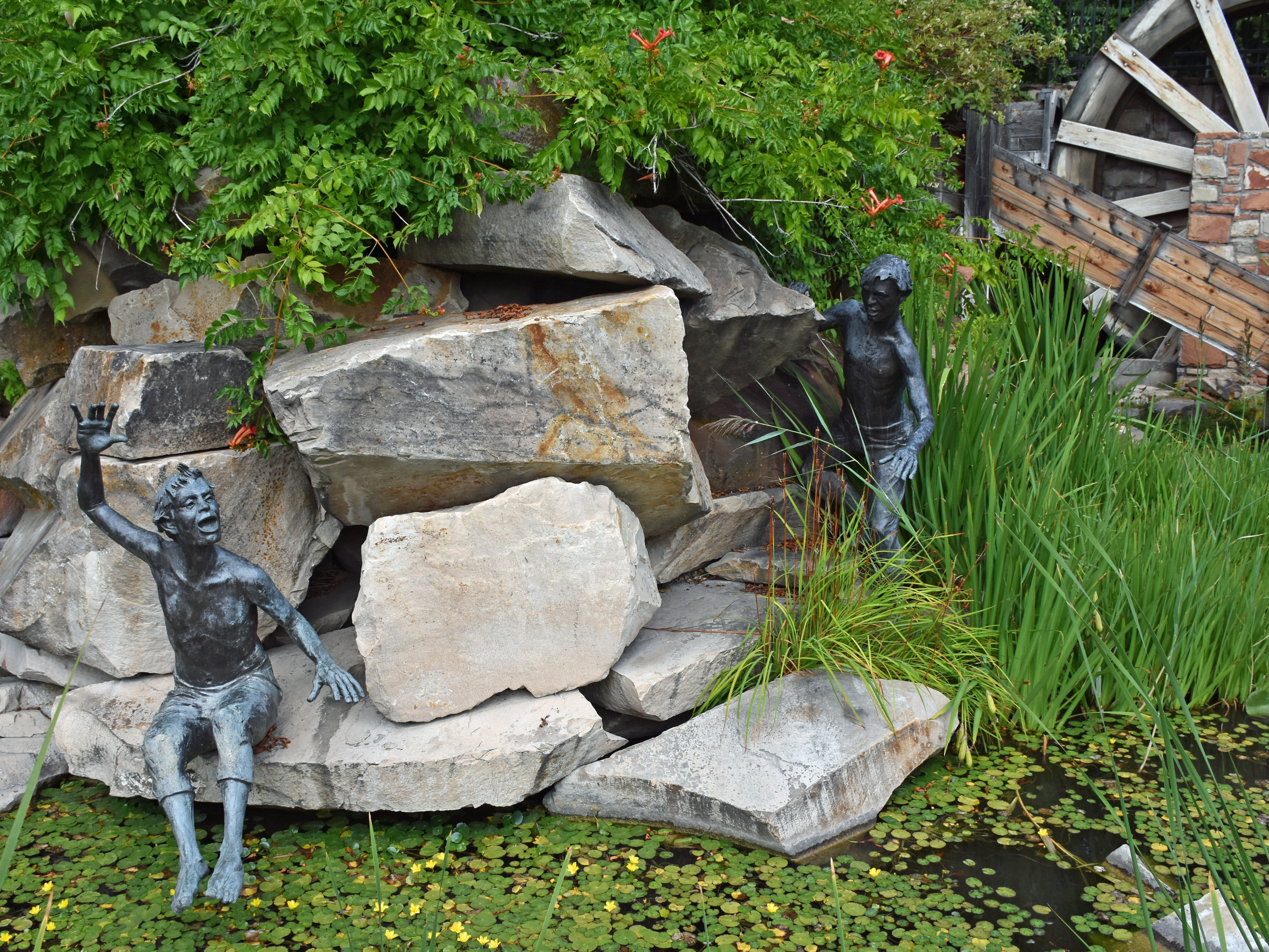
Children at play in the water

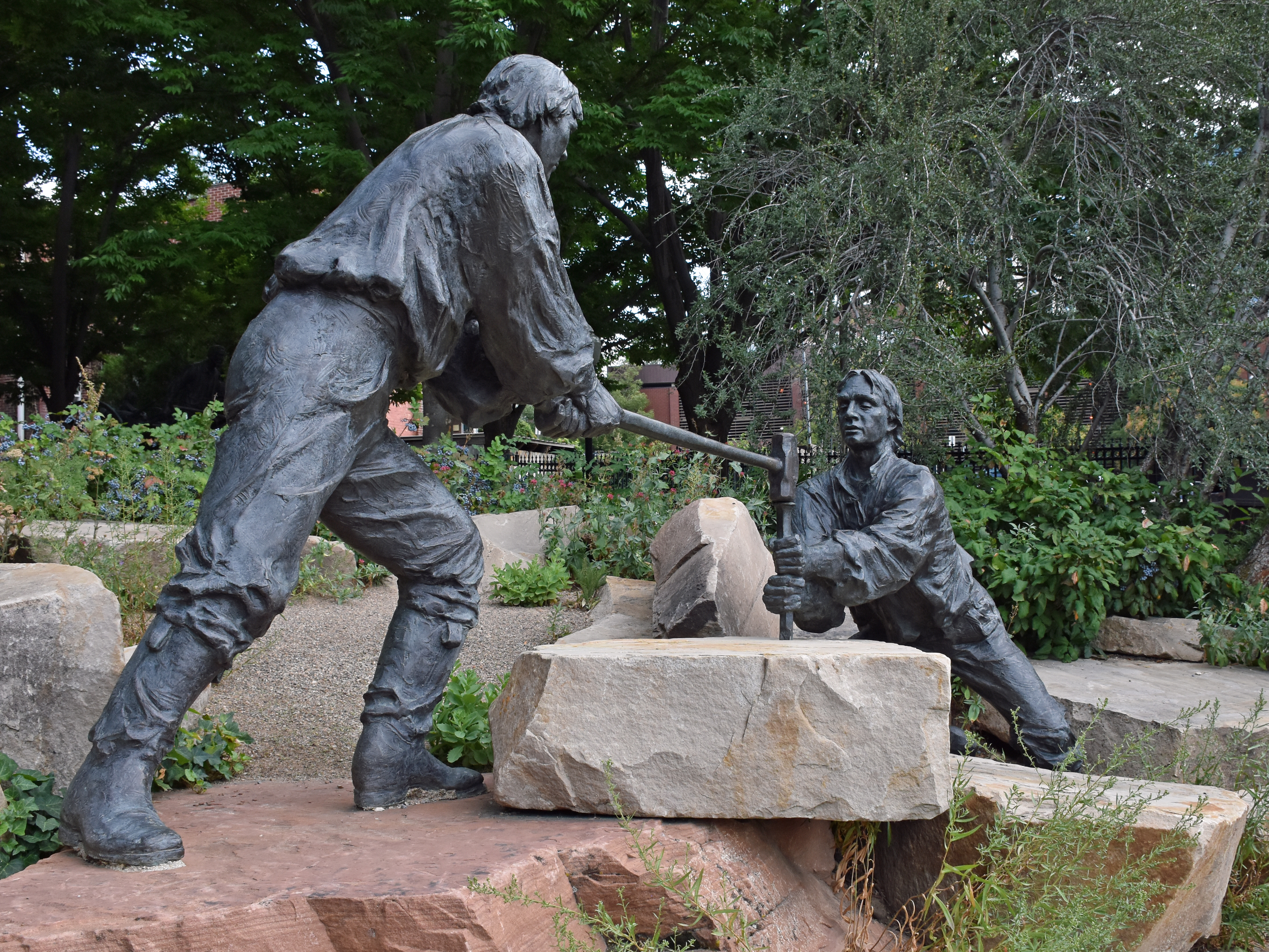
Men working in a stone quarry

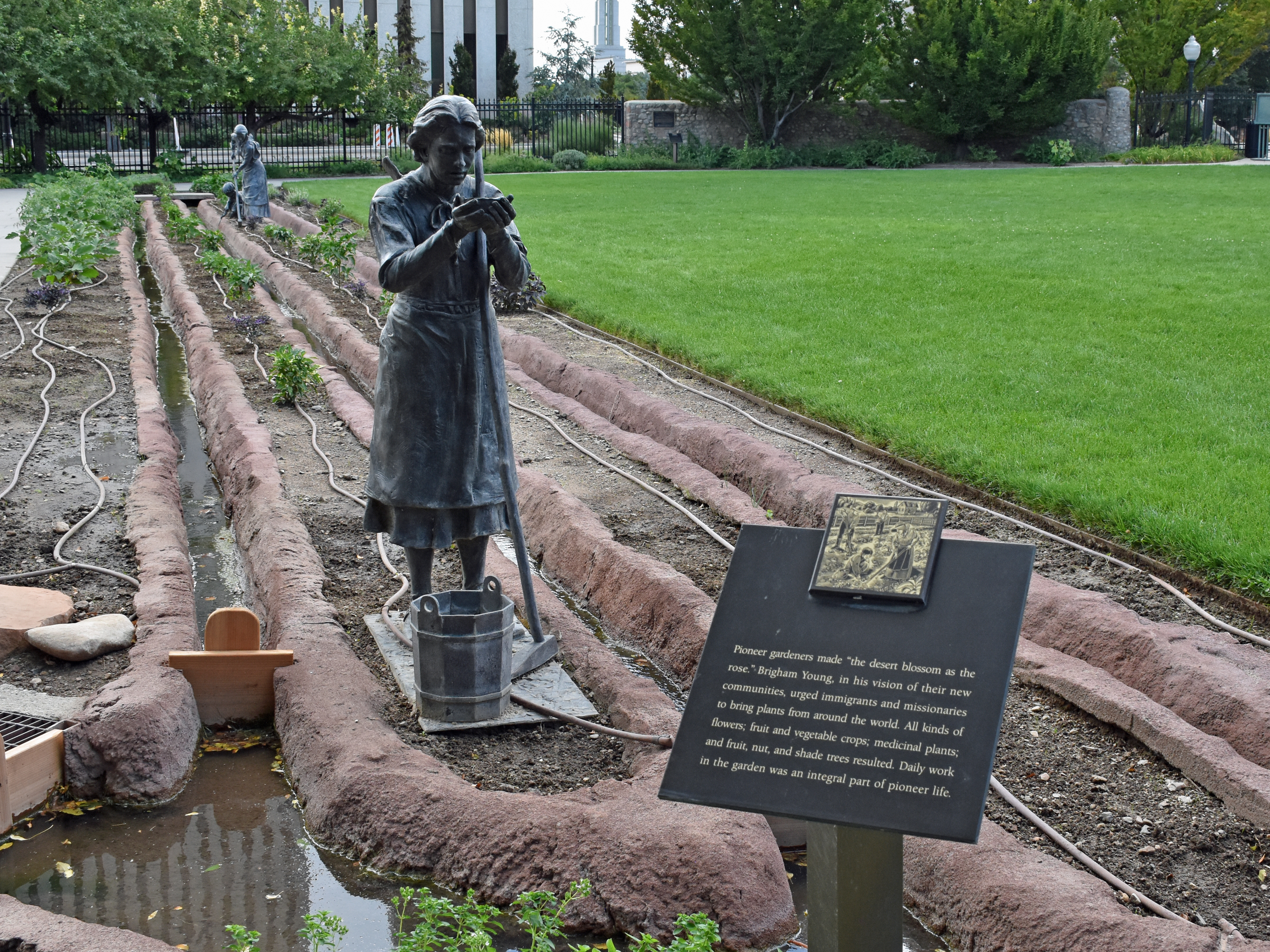
Workers planting and harvesting crops

In early 2024, the Handcart Pioneers sculpture by Torleif S. Knaphus was relocated from Temple Square to the park as part of renovations of the Salt Lake Temple and the surrounding grounds.

== History of the Park ==
=== Development ===
In September 1994, Salt Lake City Mayor Deedee Corradini and H. David Burton, of the Church of Jesus Christ of Latter-day Saints (LDS Church) announced two church-owned parking lots would be converted into parks. The creation of the parks was part of a land swap deal between the two entities, which had been in the works since 1988.

As part of the deal, the church gave the city the northern parking lot and a payment of $2.26 million (equivalent to $4,909,183 in 2025), which the city would use to transform the property into a city park, today known as City Creek Park. The church also agreed to develop the southern parking lot into its own privately owned park, today known as the Brigham Young Historic Park. In exchange, the church was given subsurface rights under a portion of Main Street and South Temple street. A short time later, the church constructed an underground parking garage for Gateway Tower West on some of this property between The ZCMI Center and Crossroads Plaza. (Note: The parking garage was constructed and opened in 1997.) It was also given title to the vacated Richards Street, whose former path ran under Crossroads Plaza.

=== Construction and opening ===
Construction of Brigham Young Historic Park began on June 12, 1995, with a groundbreaking ceremony under the direction of church president Gordon B. Hinckley. An L-shaped section of Canyon Road, which passed to the east and south of the park, was closed and planted over as part of the project. While the park was being constructed, the archeologist for the state of Utah, Kevin Jones, expressed fear that historic sites and artifacts were destroyed. This included a possible home foundation and a historic refuse dump. Two historic masonry wells were discovered and sealed, allowing them to be studied in the future.

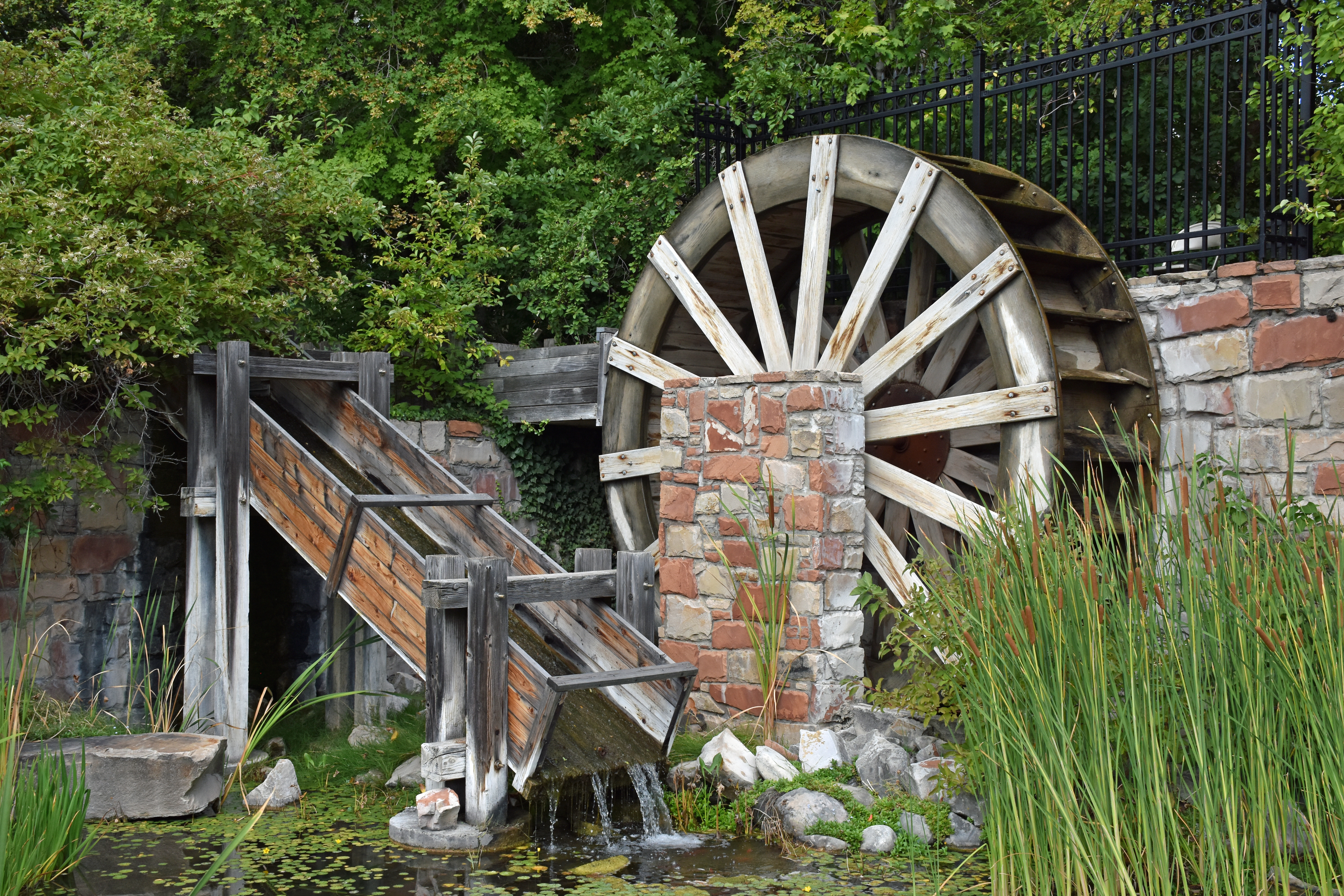
The park's water wheel feature

Both the Brigham Young Historic Park and City Creek Park were officially opened with a dedication ceremony on October 2, 1995. During the celebration, President Hinckley provided a dedicatory prayer, along with joining Mayor Corradini in a ribbon cutting.

=== Later history ===
In January 1996, during centennial celebrations for Utah's statehood, the park was used as the location for a twenty-one-cannon salute.

== See also ==
- First Encampment Park
- Brigham Young Complex
  - Beehive House
  - Lion House
- Brigham Young Forest Farmhouse
- Mormon Pioneer Memorial Monument
- This Is the Place Heritage Park
- List of historic sites of the Church of Jesus Christ of Latter-day Saints
