= City Creek Park =

Public park in Salt Lake City, Utah, U.S.

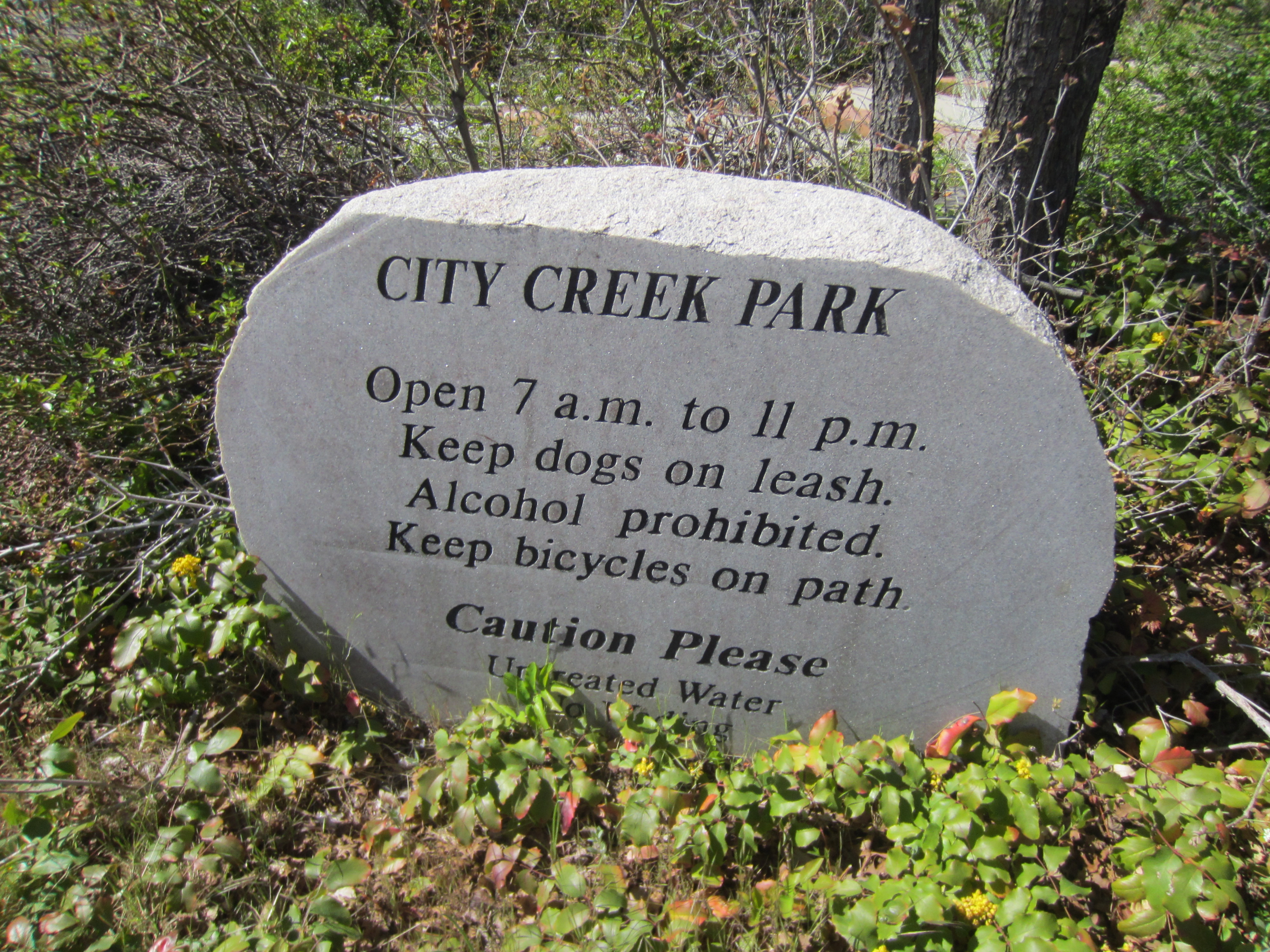
- Park sign, 2021

- Location within Utah
- Location: Salt Lake City, Utah, U.S.
- Coordinates: 40°46′20″N 111°53′16″W
- Opened: October 2, 1995
- Operator: Salt Lake City

City Creek Park is a public park in Salt Lake City, Utah, United States. Built in 1995, along with its companion park, the Brigham Young Historic Park, it was created to provide additional urban green space in the downtown area.

== Features ==
A major feature of both City Creek Park and the Brigham Young Historic Park is a daylit portion of City Creek, an important water source for the natural flora and fauna in the area, along with the Indigenous peoples and later the early settlers of Salt Lake City. City Creek had been moved into underground pipes in this area of the city during the early twentieth century and for several decades prior to the creation of the parks, the city has desired to bring it to the surface in select areas of the community.

The daylit portion of the creek begins just south of Memory Grove, its course then flows along the base of the hillside near the historic Ottinger Hall, after which it disappears under roads and reappears in landscaped medians along Canyon Road. It then flows under that road and into City Creek Park before a portion goes under Second Avenue and reemerges at the Brigham Young Historic Park, where it flows through a variety of water features.

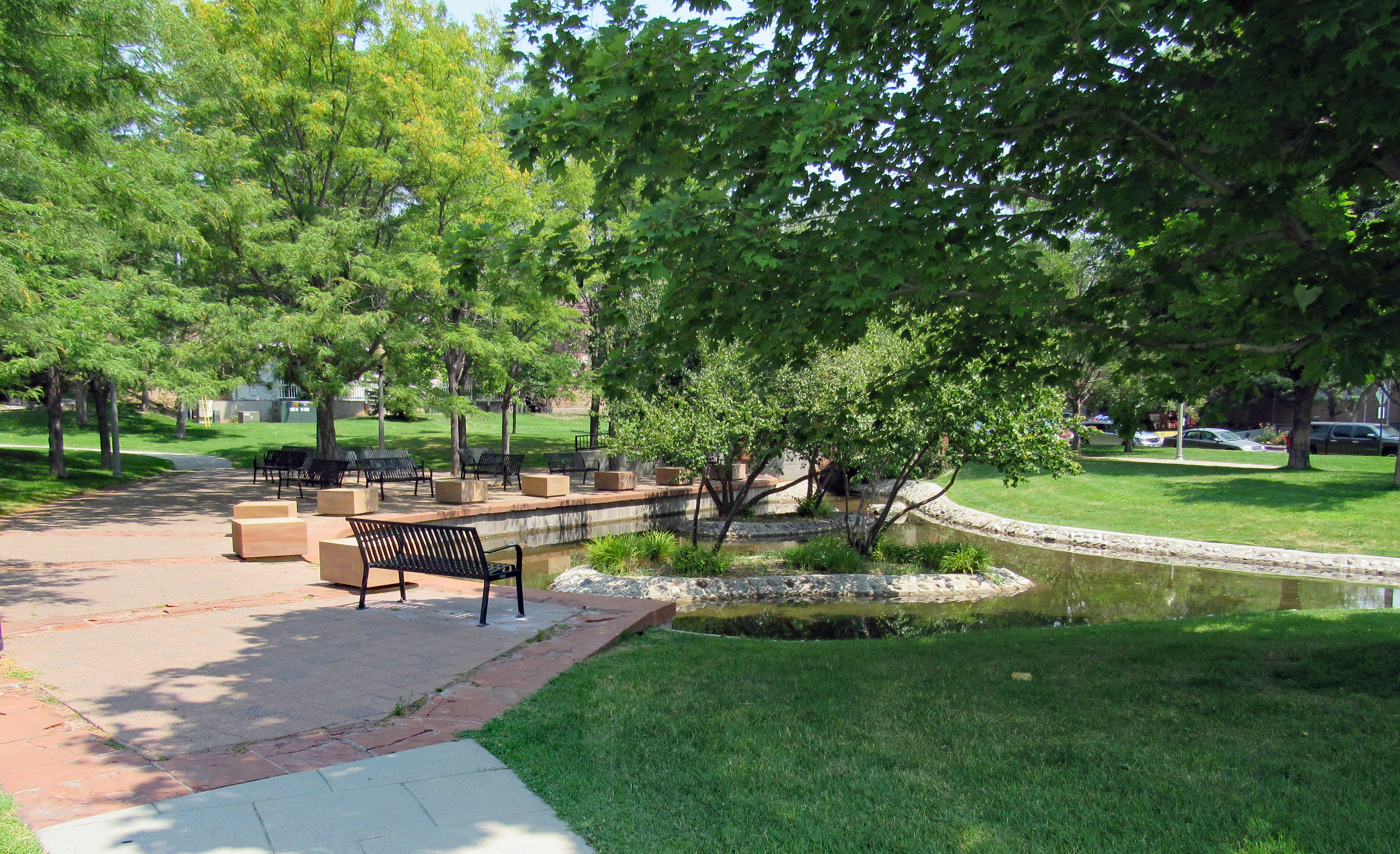
City Creek as it flows through the park

On one of the park's landscaped medians is a monument commemorating the location of Crimson Mill, the first gristmill built in Utah Territory.

== History of the Park ==
=== Development ===
In September 1994, Salt Lake City Mayor Deedee Corradini and H. David Burton, of the Church of Jesus Christ of Latter-day Saints (LDS Church) announced two church-owned parking lots would be converted into parks. The creation of the parks was part of a land swap deal between the two entities, which had been in the works since 1988.

As part of the deal, the church gave the city the northern parking lot and a payment of $2.26 million (equivalent to $4,909,183 in 2025), which the city would use to transform the property into a city park, today known as City Creek Park. The church also agreed to develop the southern parking lot into its own privately owned park, today known as the Brigham Young Historic Park. In exchange, the church was given subsurface rights under a portion of Main Street and South Temple street. It was also given title to the vacated Richards Street, whose former path ran under Crossroads Plaza.

=== Construction and opening ===
Construction of the park began with a groundbreaking on March 20, 1995. Both the Brigham Young Historic Park and City Creek Park were officially opened with a dedication ceremony on October 2, 1995. During the celebration, LDS Church president Gordon B. Hinckley provided a dedicatory prayer, along with joining Mayor Corradini in a ribbon cutting.
