= Handcart Pioneers (sculpture) =

Sculpture in Salt Lake City, Utah, U.S.

- Handcart Pioneers Monument, The Handcart Family
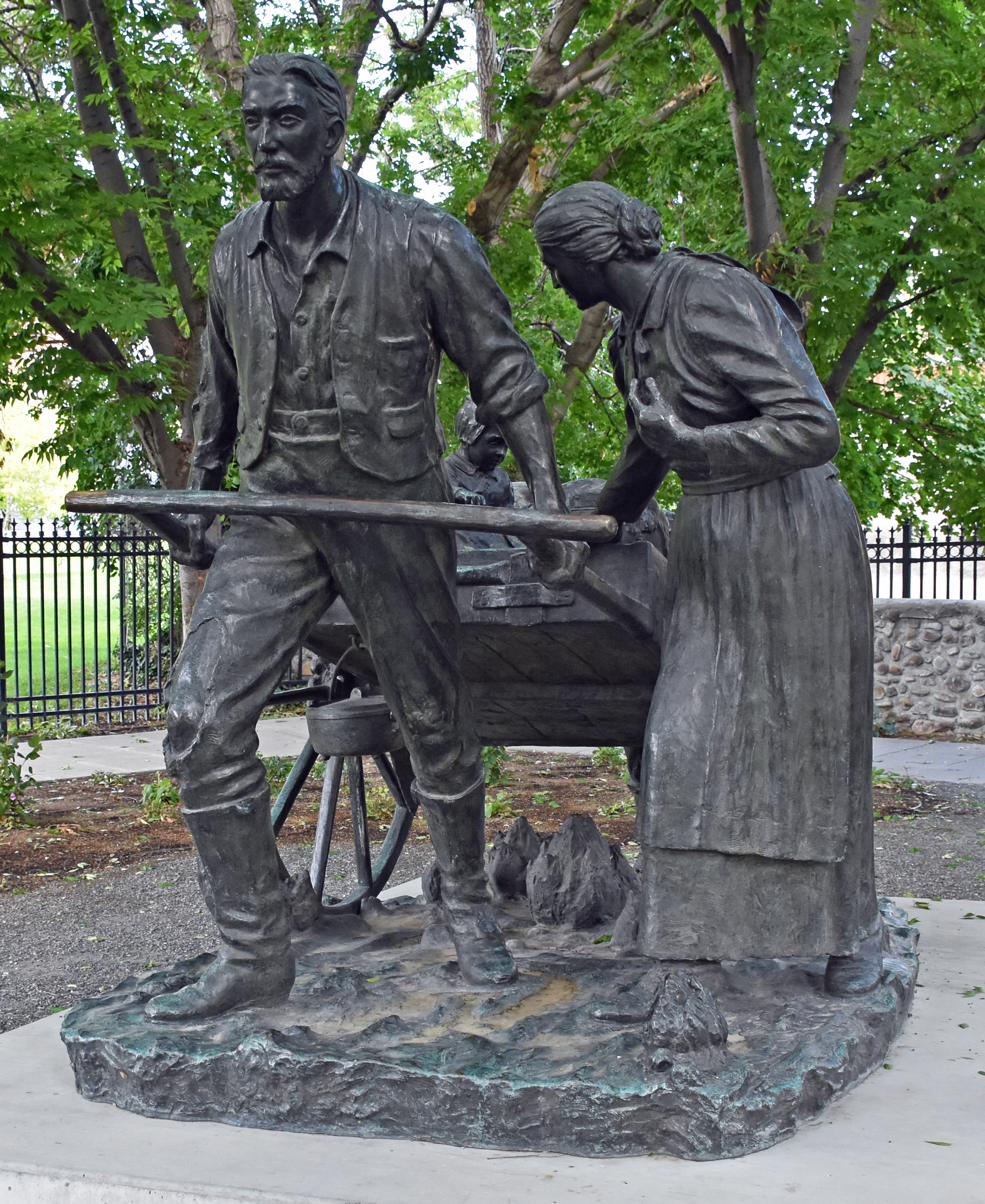
- The heroic-size statue on display at the Brigham Young Historic Park
- Artist: Torleif S. Knaphus
- Year: 1926 (original); 1947 (heroic-size)
- Medium: Bronze sculpture
- Dimensions: 1.8 m × 1.2 m × 3.0 m (6 ft × 4 ft × 10 ft)
- Weight: 5,600 pounds (2,500 kg)
- Location: Salt Lake City, Utah, United States; 40°46′15.89″N 111°53′13.82″W
- Owner: The Church of Jesus Christ of Latter-day Saints

Handcart Pioneers (also known as the Handcart Pioneers Monument and officially named The Handcart Family by the artist) is a bronze sculpture by Torleif S. Knaphus. The work is a memorial to the Mormon handcart pioneers, who, while traveling along the Mormon Trail in the mid-19th century, pulled handcarts to transport their belongings.

The original sculpture is approximately 3 feet (0.91 m) tall and was unveiled in 1926 in the Bureau of Information on Temple Square in Salt Lake City, Utah, where it was displayed for many years. In 1947, a heroic-size version was created for the gardens on Temple Square. In early 2024, the heroic-sized artwork was moved to the Brigham Young Historic Park as part of a redesign of Temple Square related to renovations of the Salt Lake Temple. Several other copies of the sculpture are located throughout the world.

== Description ==
The sculpture depicts a family traveling by handcart across the Great Plains. The cart is being pulled by the father, while a son pushes from behind. The mother, walking alongside the handcart, is turned in attention to a young daughter riding in the cart.

The heroic-size version measures approximately 6 ft × 4 ft × 10 ft (1.8 m × 1.2 m × 3.0 m). Formerly, when the sculpture was located on Temple Square, a nearby plaque read:

Handcart Pioneer Monument / The Handcart Pioneer Monument is a / tribute to the thousands of hardy Mormon / pioneers who, because they could not / afford the larger ox-drawn wagons, walked / across the rugged plains in the 1850s / pulling and pushing all their posses / sions in handmade all-wood handcarts. / Some 250 died on the journey, but nearly / 3,000, mostly British converts, completed the 1,350-mile trek from Iowa City, Iowa, to / the Salt Lake Valley. Many Latter-Day Saints / today proudly recount the trials and the triumphs of their ancestors who were among the Mormon handcart pioneers.

== History ==
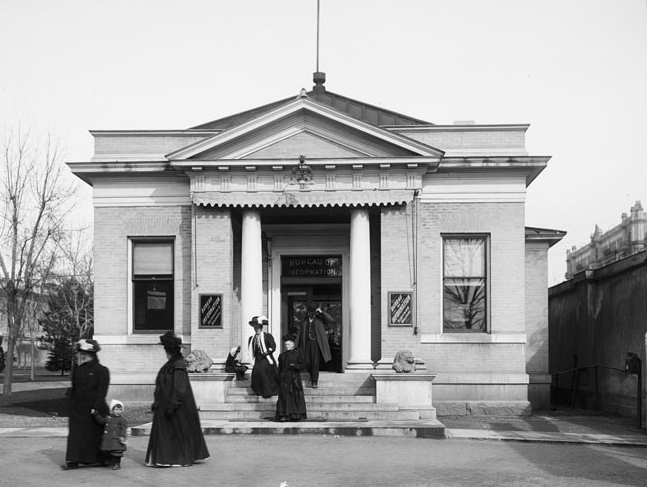
The Bureau of Information on Temple Square; the original 3-foot (0.91 m) tall Handcart Pioneers sculpture was displayed in the lobby of this building for many years

The sculpture had its beginnings in the early 20th Century when organizations were founded to memorialize the Mormon handcart pioneers, including the Handcart Veterans Association (made up of surviving handcart pioneers) and the Daughters of Utah Handcart Pioneers. (Note: Established in 1910, the Daughters of Utah Handcart Pioneers was a separate organization from the well-known Daughters of Utah Pioneers.) In April 1917, the Veterans Association proposed the construction of a monument, appointing representatives to contact fellow veterans and determine the level of support they and their descendants would provide. The outreach and fundraising continued for several years, with LDS Church president Joseph F. Smith selecting a site for the monument just east of the statues of Joseph and Hyrum Smith on Temple Square, shortly before his death in 1918. In 1919, the Veterans Association made their own selection of a site 50 feet (15 m) south of the Salt Lake Temple; however its construction was still contingent on raising the needed funds. By 1920, a design consisting of a 13-foot (4.0 m) high granite shaft, with plaques on all four sides listing the handcart companies and their members, had been submitted. Three years later, a bill was considered before the Utah State Legislature to help fund the monument, however it did not pass.

In December 1923, Charles W. Nibley, the church's Presiding Bishop, announced that the monument would now consist of a sculpture by Norwegian-American artist, Torleif S. Knaphus. By that time, a model of the sculpture had already been completed, which showed a father pulling a handcart with a small child perched atop of the cart, a mother walking alongside, and a small boy pushing the cart from the rear. The completed statue was unveiled on September 25, 1926 by Church President Heber J. Grant, with two surviving handcart pioneers in attendance (Alfred Burningham of Bountiful and Michael Jensen of Gunnison) along with the Daughters of Utah Handcart Pioneers. Titled The Handcart Family and cast in bronze in Chicago, the statue stood on a table in the lobby of the Bureau of Information on Temple Square.

=== Heroic-sized version ===
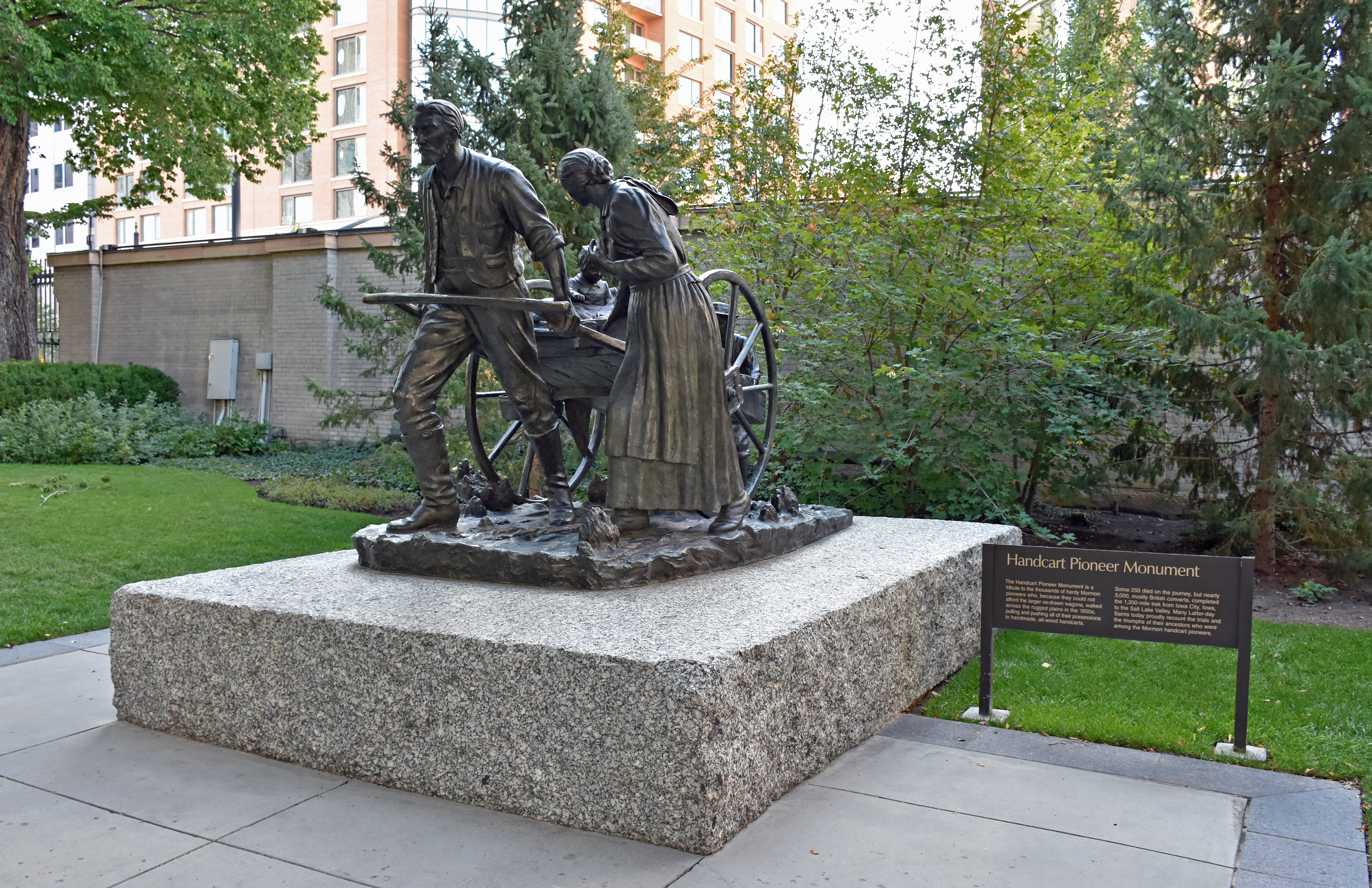
Handcart Pioneers at its former (1967–2024) Temple Square location

In 1938, the church's First Presidency commissioned Knaphus to create an enlarged version of the original 3-foot (0.91 m) tall statue, to be placed outdoors on Temple Square. The new work was cast at the Roman Bronze Company of New York, with the tallest figure standing 6 feet 10 inches (2.08 m) high. While the completed casting was being brought by railroad to Salt Lake City, excavation near the north gate of Temple Square for the monument base started in September 1947. The 5,600-pound (2,500 kg) statue arrived in the city at the end of that month, and was placed on its new concrete-cast stone base on October 2, 1947, in time for General Conference.

In 1960, the church announced that a new visitors' center would be constructed on the northwest corner of Temple Square and that the Handcart Pioneers sculpture would be relocated, as it sat on the proposed site. That September, the artwork was moved to the south side of the square, near the Seagull Monument, where it would rest on a pedestal of redwood timbers, designed to allow shrubs and flowers to grow underneath. In 1967, the sculpture was transferred from the timbers to new granite base in the same general location.

The artwork was surveyed by the Smithsonian Institution's "Save Outdoor Sculpture" program in 1993. In early 2024, as part of a significant redesign of Temple Square related to renovations of the Salt Lake Temple, the sculpture was removed from the square and placed in the nearby Brigham Young Historic Park.

== Copies ==
A copy of the sculpture at the entrance to the Salt Lake Marriott Downtown at City Creek

A number of copies of the original-sized sculpture exist; these include a 2009 copy at the Norwegian Emigrant Museum in Ottestad, Norway, at the Salt Lake Marriott Downtown at City Creek, and in 1988, a copy was donated to the State Historical Society of Iowa (originally for the State Historical Building of Iowa, it is currently displayed in the Western Historic Trails Center in Council Bluffs, Iowa).

Artist Stanley J. Watts created a life-sized handcart statue based on Knaphus' work, which was placed outside the Marriott Hotel (Note: In August 2021, the Coralville Marriott Hotel was rebranded as the Hyatt Regency Hotel) at the Iowa River Landing in Coralville, Iowa during 2006, with funds from the Ensign Peak Foundation.
