= Brigham Young Complex =

Historic buildings in Salt Lake City, Utah, U.S.

- U.S. National Register of Historic Places
- U.S. National Historic Landmark District
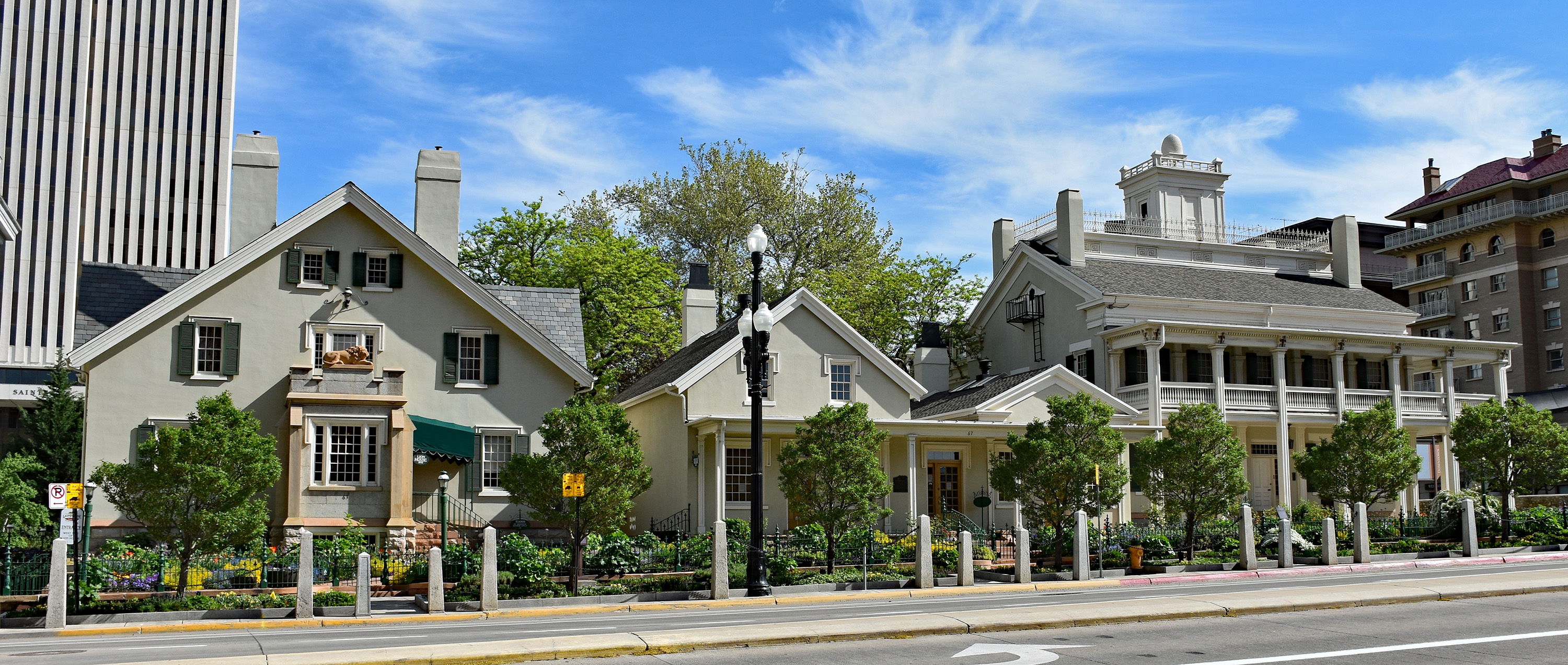
- The Brigham Young Complex. From left to right: Lion House, Church Office, Church President's/Governor's Office, and Beehive House.

- Location within Utah Location within the United States
- Location: 63-67 E. South Temple, Salt Lake City, Utah
- Coordinates: 40°46′11.2″N 111°53′19.6″W
- Area: less than one acre
- Built: 1855
- Architect: Angell, Truman O.; Ward, William
- Architectural style: Classical Revival, Late Gothic Revival
- NRHP reference No.: 66000739

Significant dates
- Added to NRHP: October 15, 1966
- Designated NHLD: January 28, 1964

The Brigham Young Complex is a collection of buildings historically associated with the second President and leader of the LDS Church Brigham Young, on East South Temple in the center of Salt Lake City, Utah.

The complex, the surviving part of a once-larger compound belonging to Young, includes the Beehive House, Young's family residence, the Lion House, his official residence as church leader and governor of the Utah Territory, and two small office buildings he used for official business. The complex is a National Historic Landmark District for its association with Young, whose leadership included the rapid expansion of Mormon settlement across the American West. It is located at the southeastern corner of the enlarged Temple Square area, occupying the northwest corner of East South Temple and State Street.

== History ==
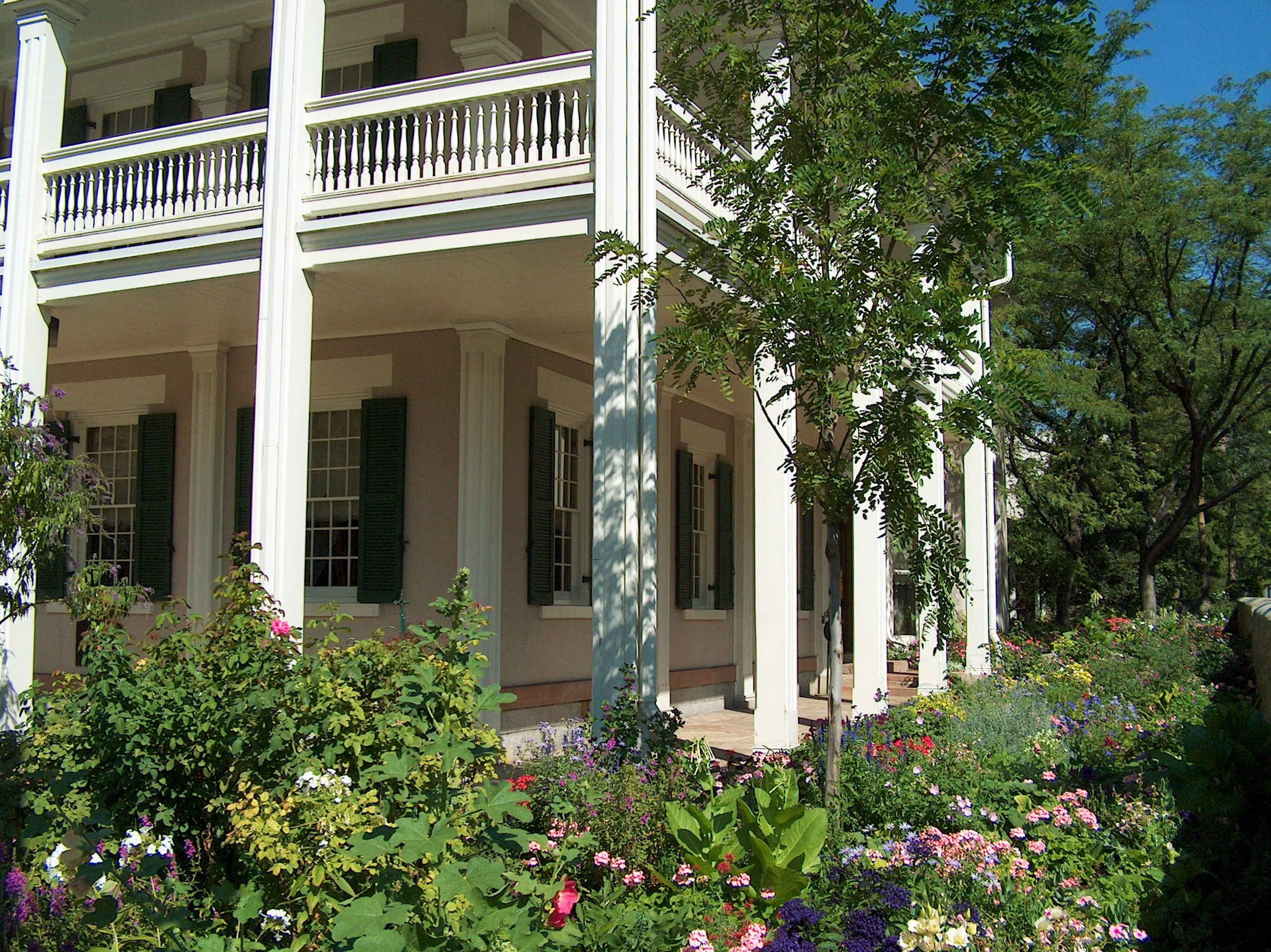
Beehive House and Garden

The Brigham Young Complex is set apart from later construction by a rubble wall, portions of which were originally placed when Brigham Young designated the site in the 1850s, and portions are relocated to the area's north and west boundaries due to road widening projects. From right to left, the complex consists of the Beehive House, the President's Office, the Governor's Office, and the Lion House. The buildings are stylistically reminiscent of earlier 19th-century New England styles, with some Gothic detailing. Truman O. Angell was responsible for the design of the buildings, all of which were built in the 1850s. The right three buildings are now joined by a modern ell in the rear.

These houses were the residence of Brigham Young from 1852 until his death in 1877. As President of the Church of Jesus Christ of Latter-day Saints (LDS Church) at the time of the Mormon settlement of the Salt Lake Valley, Young and his home were pivotal in the development of the Church, Utah, and the American west. The two houses were designated as a National Historic Landmark in 1964, and the landmark designation was later expanded to include the two office buildings.

Prior to the construction of these buildings, Young housed his family and conducted the affairs of the church and territory from log structures which no longer stand. The first of the surviving buildings to be finished was the Governor's Office, built in 1852–4. It was used by Young to house his civic administration of the Deseret Territory, later the Utah Territory. The President's Office and Beehive House were completed in 1855; the former was the seat of church business, while the Beehive House served as a ceremonial governor's mansion. The Lion House was erected in 1855–56, and was designed to house Young's large family (12 wives and 35 children).

== Current use ==
The buildings are now owned by the Church of Jesus Christ of Latter-day Saints; the Beehive House is open for tours, and the Lion House is operated as an event venue. In 2020, the Brigham Young Complex and other historic sites on Temple Square were closed to the public due to the COVID-19 pandemic.

== See also ==
- Brigham Young Historic Park
- List of National Historic Landmarks in Utah
- National Register of Historic Places listings in Salt Lake City
- Temple Square
