= William Ward (Utah architect) =

American architect

William Ward III (September 2, 1827 in Leicester, England – January 13, 1893 in Utah) was an architect, artist, and builder. Born in England, he converted to Mormonism and emigrated to Utah in 1850. While there, he carved Utah's block of limestone for the Washington Monument. In 1856, he moved to St. Louis, Missouri, and continued to live in the Midwest until returning to Utah in 1888. He died of lung fever in 1893, shortly after his wife succumbed to pneumonia.

A couple of his works are listed on the U.S. National Register of Historic Places.

== Works ==
=== Gallery ===
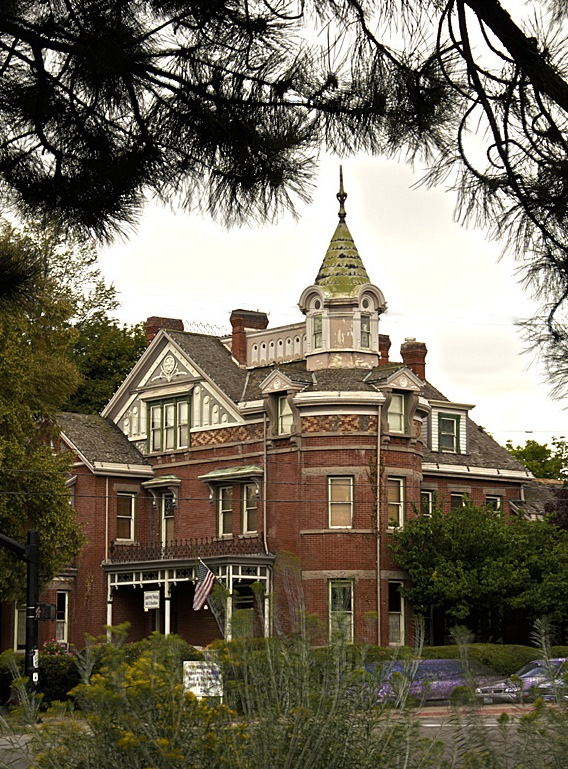
Francis Armstrong House, 667 E. 1st South Salt Lake City, UT*NRHP listed

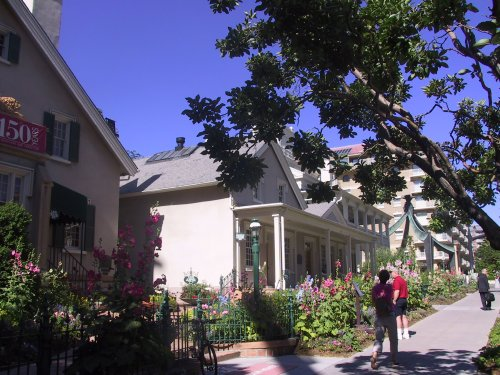
Brigham Young Complex, 63–67 E. South Temple St. Salt Lake City, UT*NRHP listed
