= Beehive House =

Historic building in Salt Lake City, Utah, U.S.

- U.S. National Register of Historic Places
- U.S. National Historic Landmark District – Contributing property
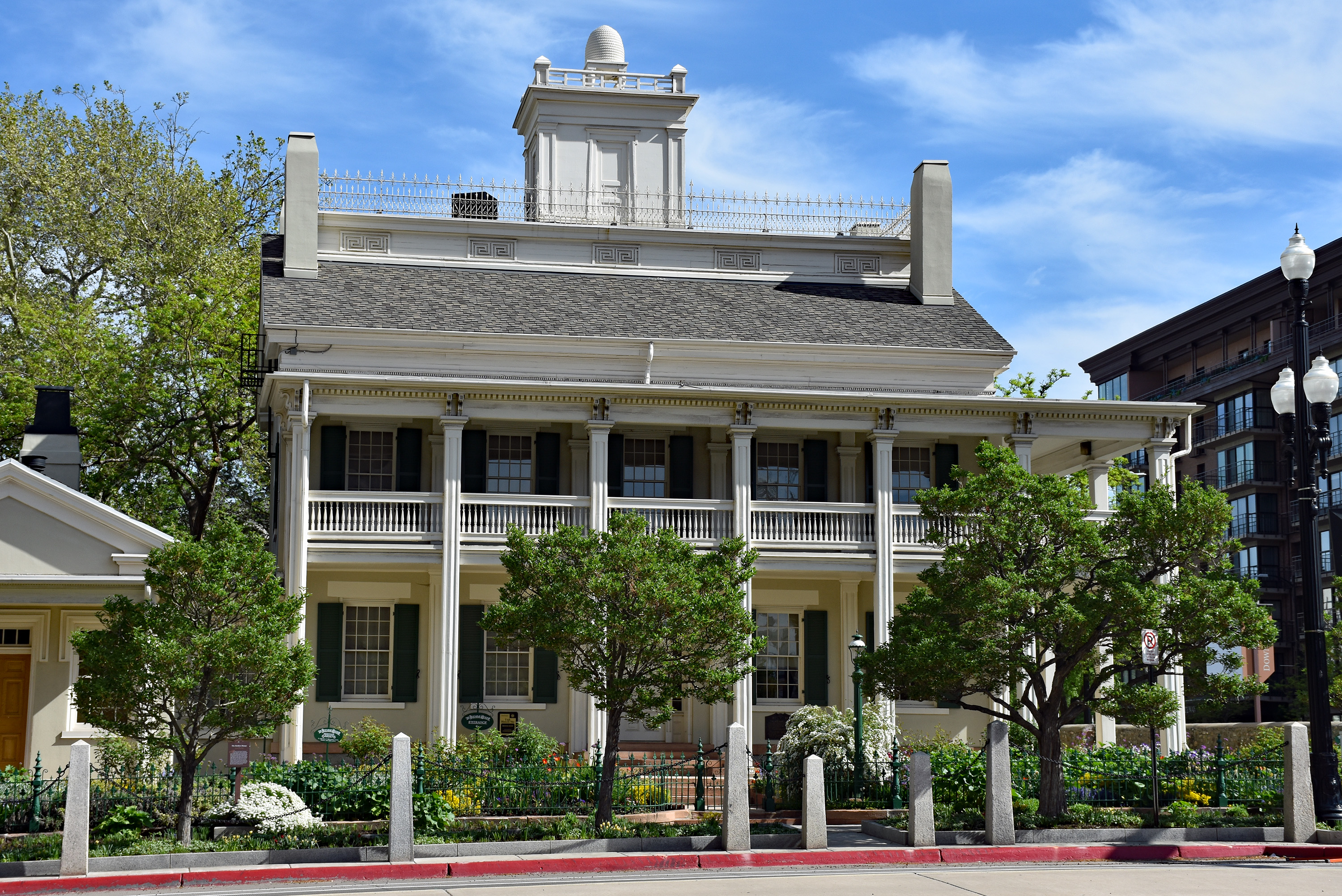
- South Temple Street entrance to the Beehive House
- Location: 67 E South Temple St, Salt Lake City, Utah
- Coordinates: 40°46′10.995″N 111°53′18.7578″W
- Built: 1854
- Architect: Angell, Truman O.
- Architectural style: Greek Revival
- Part of: Brigham Young Complex (ID66000739)
- NRHP reference No.: 70000626
- Added to NRHP: February 26, 1970

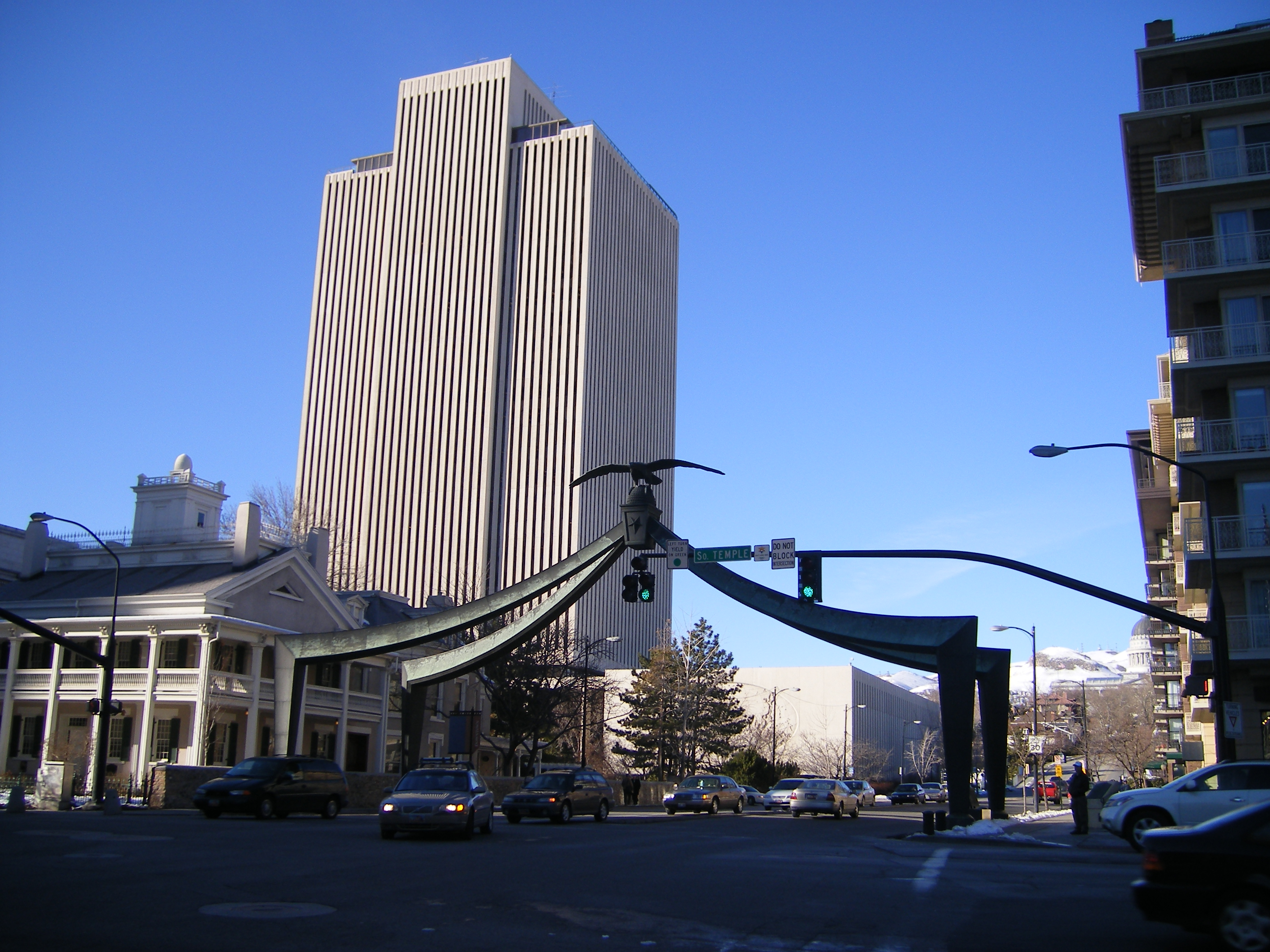
Beehive House (left), Eagle Gate, and LDS Church Office Building

The Beehive House is a building constructed in 1854 which was one of the residences of Brigham Young, the second President of the Church of Jesus Christ of Latter-day Saints, in Salt Lake City, Utah, United States. The name originates from the beehive sculpture atop the house, as early Mormons used honeybees to symbolize industry and cooperation. The Beehive House was also the executive mansion during the existence of Utah Territory and later served as a women’s boarding house.

The home is normally operated as historic house museum, but has been closed for renovation since 2023, with an expected reopening in 2027.

== Executive mansion of Brigham Young ==
The Beehive House was constructed in 1854, two years before the neighboring Lion House was built (also a residence of Young's). Both homes are one block east of the Salt Lake Temple and Temple Square on South Temple street in downtown Salt Lake City. The home was designed by Truman O. Angell, Young's brother-in-law and architect of the Salt Lake Temple, who also designed the Lion House. It was constructed of adobe and sandstone.

Young was a polygamist, and the Beehive House was designed to accommodate his large family. The Beehive House was also his residence as governor of Utah Territory and president of the LDS Church. Upon its completion, Young briefly shared the Beehive House with his senior (and only legally recognized) wife Mary Ann Angell (1803–1882), though she chose to make her home in the White House, a smaller residence on the property. Young's first polygamous wife, Lucy Ann Decker Young (1822–1890), possibly due to her seniority, became hostess of the Beehive House and lived there with her nine children.

The Beehive House served as the executive mansion of the Utah Territory from 1852 to 1855 and was where Young entertained guests. The home is connected by a suite of rooms to the Lion House. This suite included Young's offices and his private bedroom where he died in 1877.

== Private uses after Young's death ==
After Young's death, there was much dispute and some litigation by Young's heirs as to what was Young's property and what was the church's property. The Beehive House was among the properties in contention; title was ultimately given to Young's heirs. The Beehive House was replaced as the executive mansion by the much grander Gardo House, at which time it was briefly occupied by Young's religious successors John Taylor and Wilford Woodruff.

Beginning in the late 1880s, Young's son, John W. Young, added a large Victorian style addition to the rear of the building, and heavily remodeled the older portion of the home. The Young family lost the home when it was sold at auction in 1893 to satisfy debts held by John W. Young.

John Beck, a successful miner and businessman, lived in the home for a short time before it was also sold to satisfy his creditors. Eventually it was purchased by the Church, and was used as the official home of church presidents Lorenzo Snow and his successor Joseph F. Smith, both of whom died in the mansion. Smith, who died in 1918, was the last church president to practice polygamy at the time of his death and shared the residence with four of his wives.

== Subsequent history ==
=== Boarding house ===
In 1920, the Young Women Mutual Improvement Association of the LDS Church opened the Beehive House as a boarding home for single women working in Salt Lake City, many of whom were working as secretaries at the adjacent buildings of the LDS Church's headquarters complex. It continued to operate as a boarding house until the 1950s.

=== Restoration ===
The building was restored in 1959–60 under the direction of Georgius Y. Cannon, a grandson to Brigham Young. It is now a historic house museum with period furnishings (many original to the house) to depict the Young family's life in the mid-19th century. Daily tours are given by Church missionaries free of charge.

== See also ==
- Brigham Young Forest Farmhouse
- Brigham Young Historic Park
- Brigham Young Winter Home and Office
