= Francis Armstrong House =

Historic house in Salt Lake City, Utah, U.S.

- U.S. National Register of Historic Places
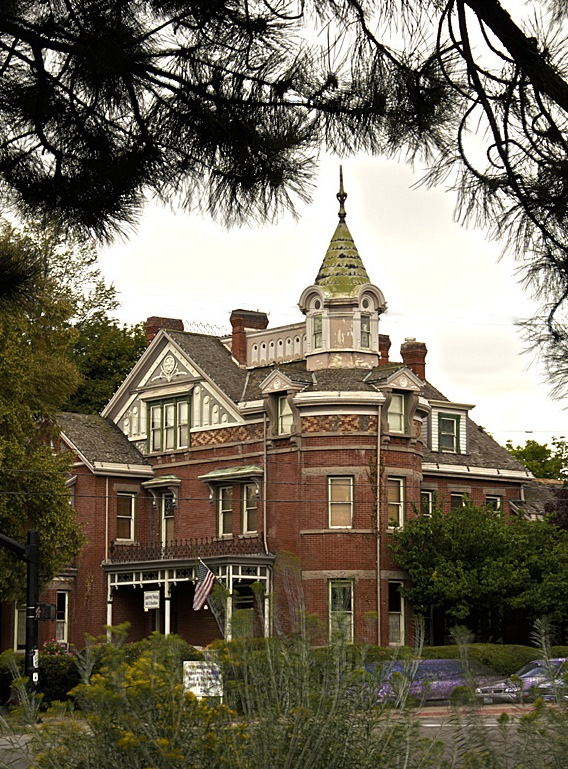

- Location within Utah Location within the United States
- Location: 667 East 1st South, Salt Lake City, Utah
- Coordinates: 40°46′3″N 111°52′16″W
- Area: less than one acre
- Built: 1892
- Architect: Ward, William
- Architectural style: Queen Anne, Eastlake
- NRHP reference No.: 80003914
- Added to NRHP: May 23, 1980

The Francis Armstrong House (also known as Tower Apartments) is a historic house in Salt Lake City, Utah. It is locally significant as a fine example of Queen Anne style architecture.

== Description and history ==
The 3 1/2-story, Queen Anne style house was built in 1892, and was designed by William Ward and constructed by Taylor, Romney & Armstrong as the home of Salt Lake City mayor Francis Armstrong. The scheme of the house is thought to have been brought over by Armstrong from England in 1891, and is apparently based on an English home of the period. It was listed on the National Register of Historic Places on May 23, 1980.
