= Lion House (Salt Lake City) =

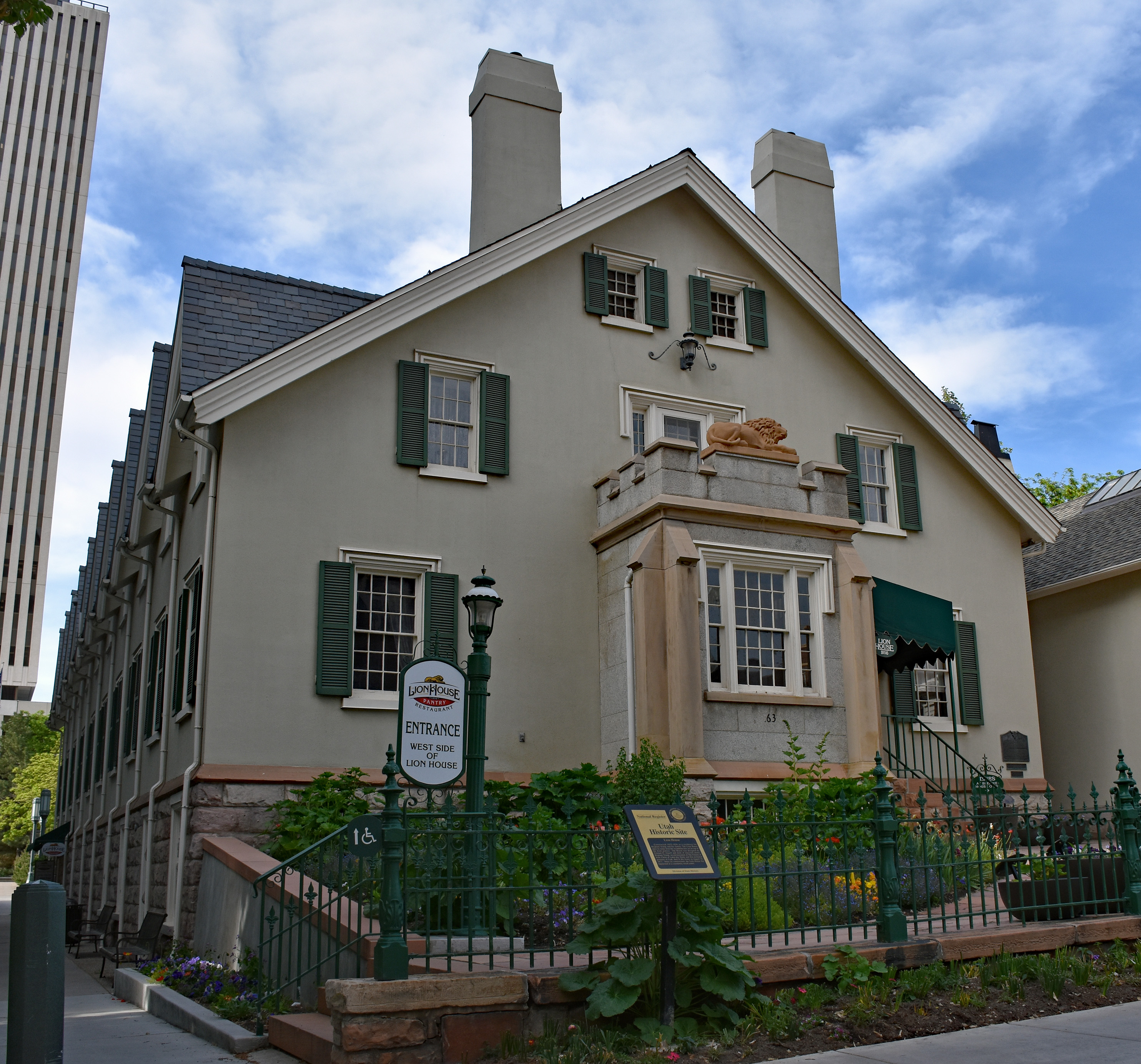
- South Temple Street entrance to the Lion House

General information
- Location: 63 East South Temple, Salt Lake City, United States
- Coordinates: 40°46′11″N 111°53′20.5″W
- Estimated completion: 1856

Design and construction
- Architect: Truman O. Angell

The Lion House is a large residence built in 1856 by Brigham Young, second president of the Church of Jesus Christ of Latter-day Saints (LDS Church), in Salt Lake City, Utah.

Used for a variety of purposes following the death of Young, the building was closed in 2020, due to the COVID-19 pandemic and has remained closed for renovation and restoration, with an expected reopening in spring 2027. It is expected that its former restaurant, The Lion House Pantry, will be replaced by museum space as part of the restoration project.

== History ==
Truman Osborn Angell, Young's brother-in-law, by his first wife Mary Ann Angell, and designer of the Salt Lake Temple, was also involved in the design of this home. The house got its name from the statue of a lion, sculpted by the craftsman William Ward III, above the front entrance. Lion of the Lord was a nickname of Young. The design is a Gothic Revival mansion with 20 gables for 20 small bedrooms.

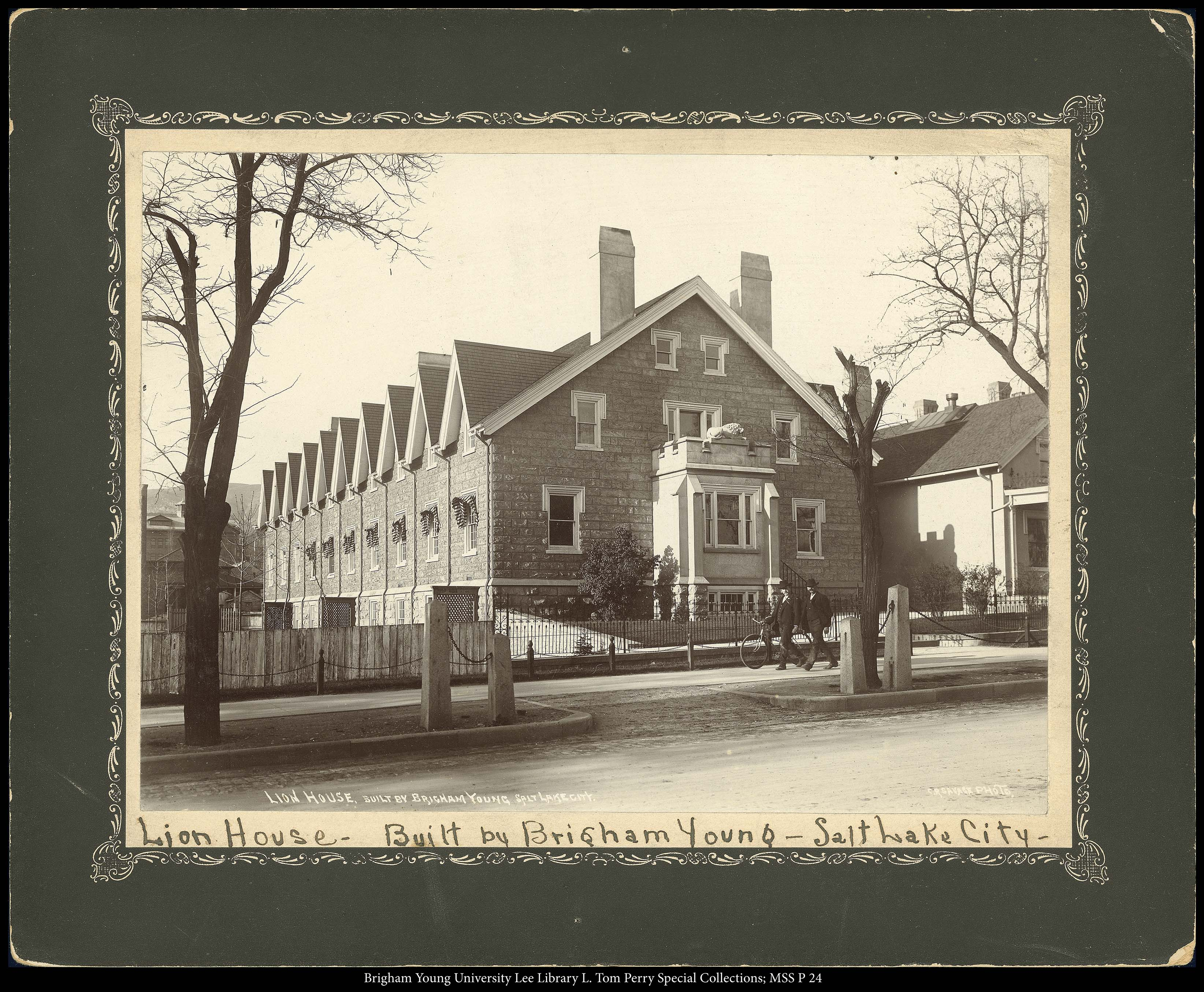
The Lion House

The house is situated at 63 East South Temple, near the corner of South Temple and State Street, just one block east of Temple Square. It is adjacent to Young's other official residence, the Beehive House, to which it is connected by a series of rooms used as offices.

A polygamist, Young ultimately fathered 57 children by more than two dozen wives, and also had many adopted, foster, and stepchildren. He owned residences throughout Salt Lake City and Utah Territory, but many of his wives and children were housed in the Lion House. The house contains large public rooms on the ground floor with bedrooms on the upper floors and was home to as many as 12 of Young's wives, including Eliza R. Snow.

In 1870, the Young Ladies’ Department of the Ladies’ Cooperative Retrenchment Association was founded in the Lion House—now called Young Women. In the 1920s, the Lion House housed the domestic science department of LDS University. In the 1930s, it was operated by the Young Women Mutual Improvement Association of the LDS Church as a social center for study and also for renting of rooms for social events. In 2020, the Lion House and other historic sites on Temple Square were closed to the public due to the COVID-19 pandemic.

== Current use ==
The bottom floor of the Lion House is a functional, cafeteria-style restaurant called The Lion House Pantry, which is currently closed for renovation. It is located adjacent to the LDS Church's main headquarters and heavily visited Temple Square. The Lion House is also known for the Original Lion House Rolls and signature recipe created by Head Baker Bill Ellis in 1977. The Lion House retail 'brand' includes rolls, brownie and raspberry muffin baking mixes sold nationally through commercial partner Lehi Roller Mills. The building's restaurant is expected to be replaced by museum space during the 2020s restoration.

== See also ==
- Brigham Young Historic Park
- List of historic sites of The Church of Jesus Christ of Latter-day Saints
- Gardo House
