= City Creek (Salt Lake County, Utah) =

Stream in Salt Lake City, Utah, United States

Coordinates: 40°46′35″N 111°53′05″W

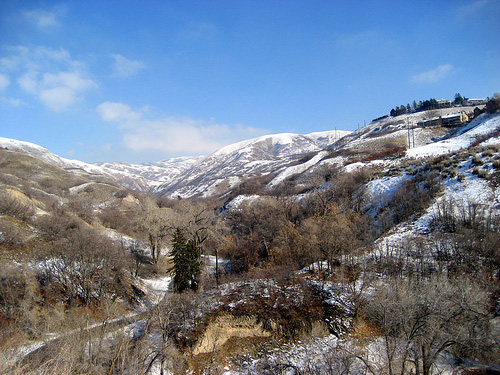
City Creek Canyon in January 2007

City Creek is a small but historically important mountain stream that flows from City Creek Canyon and across part of Salt Lake City, Utah, and into the Jordan River which empties into the Great Salt Lake. City Creek's head is about 8 miles (13 km) up City Creek Canyon northeast of Downtown Salt Lake City. The entire stream measures only about 14.5 miles (23.3 km) long. Melting snow from adjacent mountains provides most of City Creek's currents, but the stream flows year-round because of natural springs at the head of the creek.

Until 1882 City Creek served as the city's primary water supply, and it continues to provide drinking water to The Avenues and northern parts of Salt Lake City.

== History ==
Vanguards of the first Mormon pioneer settlers of Utah camped by the mouth of City Creek Canyon on July 22, 1847. This area is now about the intersection between State Street and North Temple in Salt Lake City. The stream originally forked into a stream heading south through Washington Square and the primary branch flowing west, toward Temple Square and approximately down North Temple Street. Both forks emptied into the Jordan River.

The vanguard, led by Orson Pratt, diverted the stream to soften the soil and plant crops. By July 24, when Brigham Young's party arrived, five acres (20,000 m^{2}) of potatoes had already been planted. Young named the creeks in Salt Lake Valley on August 22, 1847, calling City Creek such because it was in the heart of the city that the pioneers planned. Early maps of the area retain the Shoshone people's name for this creek- "Nah-po-pah".

Young declared that the rights to all rivers were publicly held, and administration was initially carried out by the local LDS High Council, then by local wards (congregations). In 1850 Brigham Young gained sole rights to the water, although administration continued as usual. Ward Bishops transferred the responsibility of distributing water to the city council when Salt Lake City was incorporated in 1851.

City Creek was channeled along its western fork, and canals were dug on either side of every street of Salt Lake City. Opening gates delivered water to street canals. This system, administered by Bishop-appointed water masters, delivered drinking and agricultural water to ditches in front of every resident's plot.

A piped waterworks was built to serve downtown in 1876, and the initial system was complete by June 22, 1877. However, water was unavailable in parts of the city, notably The Avenues, then called "the dry bench" because water had to be carried uphill from City Creek below. In 1878 Avenues residents petitioned the city to tax property to expand the water system, and the territorial legislature authorized the levy. A diversion to the dry bench was made in 1884, piping water to residents on 6th avenue and below. Subsequent diversions fed higher parts of the city, but it was not until 1910 that a diversion was constructed high enough to provide water to the whole city.

Water became increasingly scarce in Salt Lake City in the 1860s, especially during drought. The Red Butte Creek, used by the eastern parts of the city, was appropriated by the US Army when Fort Douglas was built in 1862. Salt Lake also grew rapidly, prompting the city council to invest in a canal project to bring more water from Utah Lake 35 miles (56 km) to the south. In 1882 the Jordan-Salt Lake Canal was completed, allowing Salt Lake City to access reliable agricultural water. In 1888 the city entered an agreement with surrounding farmers to exchange volumes of the low-grade Utah Lake water for the purer water trickling from other mountain streams in the Salt Lake Valley.

In 1909 the creek was placed in an underground conduit down North Temple Street from outside of Memory Grove to west of the State Fairpark where the water exits into the Jordan River.

=== Flood of 1983 ===
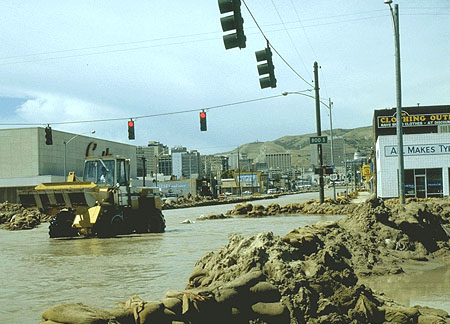
View of State Street looking north upstream during the 1983 City Creek flood

The stream remained underground until record precipitation in the winter of 1982/1983 produced an enormous snowpack in the Creek's watershed. The late onset of warmer temperatures and a sudden warm spell in May swelled the stream. Saturday night, May 28, the North Temple conduit became clogged, and the whole river overflowed into the streets, down Canyon Road, and onto State Street. Volunteers worked frantically that Sunday morning to protect local buildings by sandbagging State Street, channeling the current down the eastern half of the street to large storm sewers near the Salt Lake City and County Building at 400 South. When the sewers overflowed, the "State Street River" was extended to 1300 South, where the current flowed with other streams in conduits to the Jordan River. Temporary pedestrian bridges were built over State Street, which is part of US-89 and one of Salt Lake City's primary corridors.

The stream returned to its normal course on June 11, but cleanup took several more weeks. The flood had proved a popular attraction, and some residents suggested bringing the stream permanently above the ground and incorporating it into Salt Lake City in a more meaningful way. Attention to City Creek brought improvements to it.

By the next year, students from six high schools and local Boy Scouts constructed the "Freedom Trail" in the lower part of City Creek Canyon. In 1986 Salt Lake City drafted the "City Creek Master Plan" intending to maintain the canyon around City Creek "as a valuable watershed and recreation/open space amenity of city-wide significance."

=== Daylighting ===
A portion of City Creek was daylit in 1995, when Salt Lake City and the Church of Jesus Christ of Latter-day Saints (LDS Church) developed City Creek Park and Brigham Young Historic Park. The daylit portion of the creek begins just south of Memory Grove, its course then flows along the base of the hillside near the historic Ottinger Hall, after which it disappears under roads and reappears in landscaped medians along Canyon Road. It then flows under that road and into City Creek Park before a portion disappears under Second Avenue and reemerges at the Brigham Young Historic Park.

The LDS Church's Conference Center, completed in 2000, also features City Creek water in its landscaping. Here City Creek runs alongside North Temple street and past the Conference Center in a channel featuring rough-hewn granite boulders. Although some sources have indicated this is not daylit City Creek water.

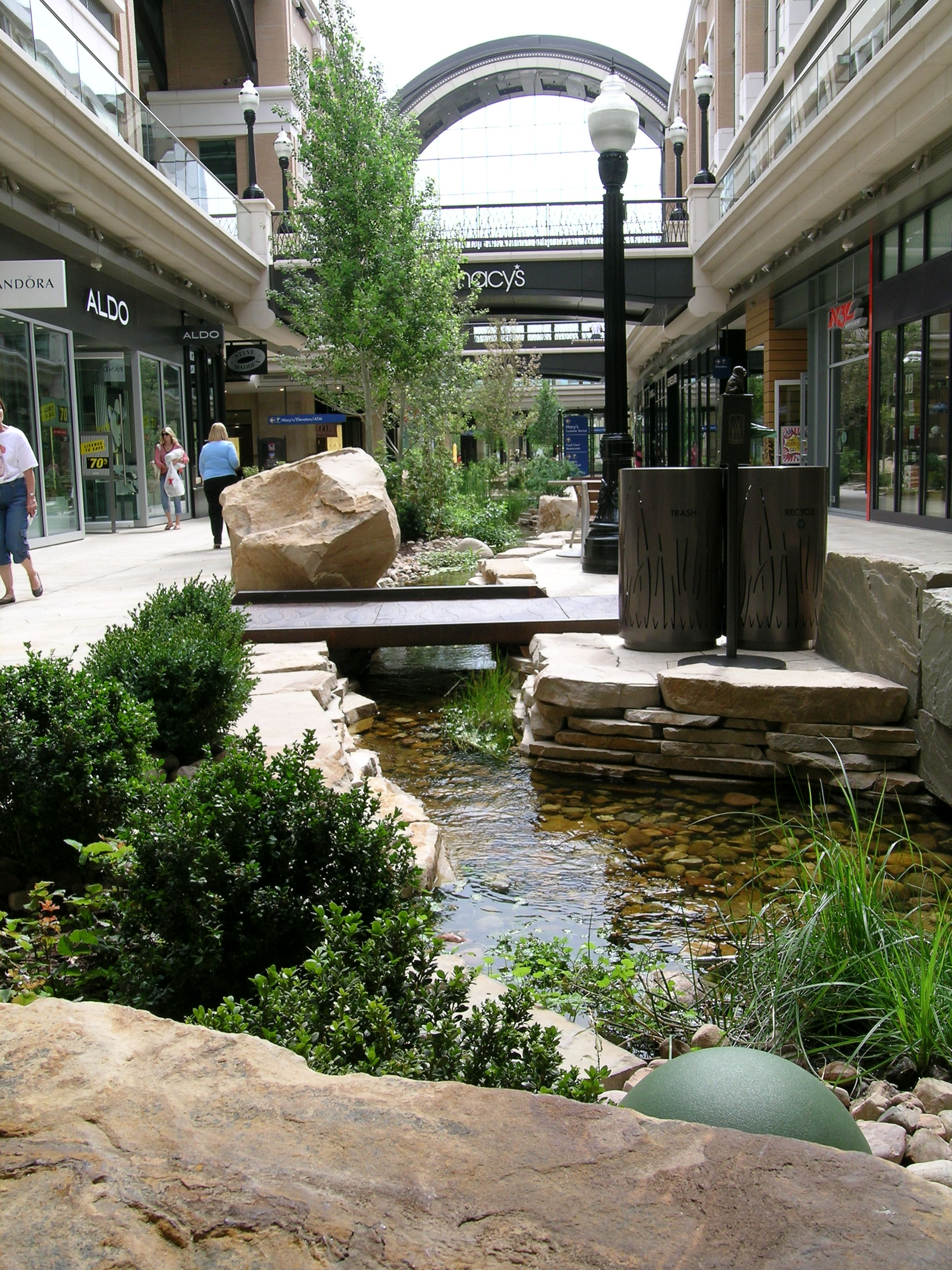
A re-creation of City Creek, using city tap water, at City Creek Center in downtown Salt Lake City.

A re-creation of City Creek was included in the construction of City Creek Center, although it does not use daylit City Creek water, instead using recirculated city tab water.

=== Fires ===
On July 29, 2008, a large grass fire started in a section of the canyon and had burned more than 180 acres (0.73 km^{2}) by the following day. The cause of the fire had been determined to be of human origin as there was no lightning present on the day it started.

== City Creek Canyon ==
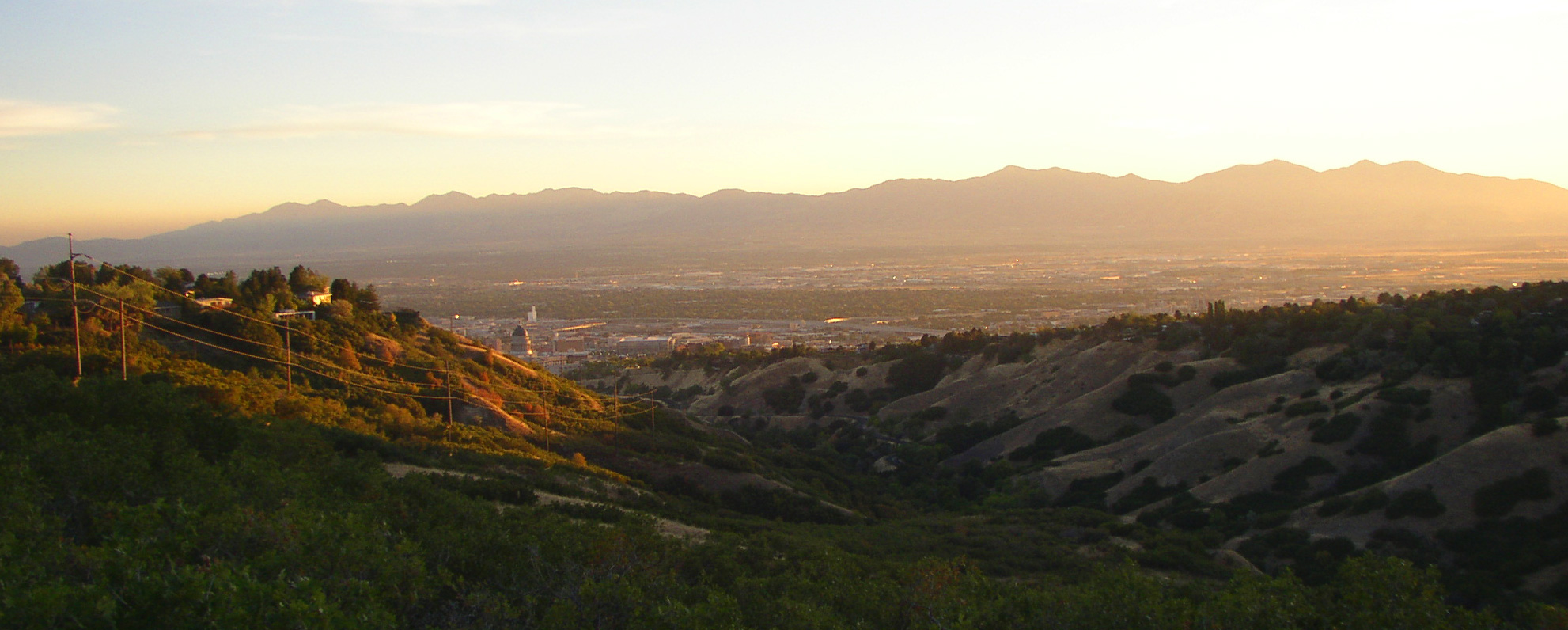
City Creek Canyon's hiking and mountain biking trails provide scenic views in all directions. This shot looks southwest from City Creek toward the Salt Lake Valley with the Oquirrh Mountains in the background.

For a brief time in 1873, City Creek Canyon was explored for mineral content. Silver, lead, and gold were found, and a town called Modoc City was established to house the miners. Although initial reports showed promising mineral values, this mining operation did not prove to be profitable and was discontinued in 1874.

Beginning in the early 20th century Salt Lake City and the US Federal government made a concerted effort to buy the watershed of City Creek. As of 2005, the drainage is mostly owned and preserved by the government. Originally this served to preserve clean water supply, but open space advocates cite it as a success of wildlife preservation.

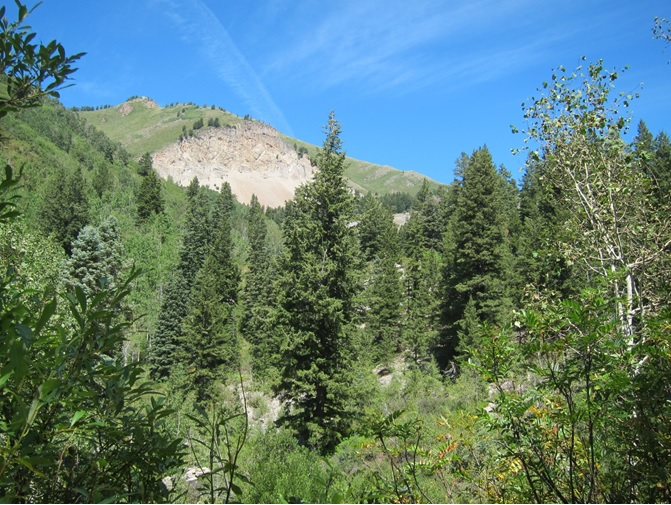
The head scarp of the Grandview Peak landslide near the top of City Creek Canyon

Less than one mile (1.6 km) from the Utah State Capitol and downtown Salt Lake City, the canyon around City Creek contains virtually no private developments. A single road extends up the canyon, accessible by walking up from Memory Grove Park or by Bonneville Boulevard, which circles the canyon, connecting The Avenues with Capitol Hill. Bonneville is a two-lane road, but cars are permitted in one lane only and must use this lane as a single-lane road. The other lane is shared by bicycles and pedestrians, which may travel in both directions. The canyon road is open to private vehicles for a small fee on even calendar days and holidays, from Memorial Day weekend to the last day of September. Bicycles are allowed on odd calendar days during the summer, except holidays. Picnic sites are available via reservation. The canyon is closed to vehicles during the winter but is open to bicycles and pedestrians. Dogs are allowed in the canyon on-leash below the water treatment plant and watershed area, whose boundary is marked by signage near the four-mile marker.

== Crossings ==
The only road crossing of the canyon north of Fourth Avenue (200 North) is the winding one-way Bonneville Boulevard. However, plans have been made for a more direct crossing. For instance, in 1916, the Salt Lake City Commission asked for bids for a proposed bridge at 11th Avenue. Later, as a World War II national defense project, a 7 miles (11 km) northerly bypass ("Bonneville Parkway") of downtown Salt Lake City was planned, connecting Fort Douglas with US-91 (now US-89) near North Salt Lake. The state legislature designated it to be State Route 231 in 1941, following 11th Avenue from the fort to a canyon crossing, and then curving north around Ensign Peak to North Salt Lake, but it was not built and was removed from the state highway system in 1945.

== See also ==
- City Creek (disambiguation)
- City Creek Center
- List of rivers of Utah
