= Crossroads Plaza (Salt Lake City) =

Former shopping mall in Salt Lake City, Utah

- Location: Salt Lake City, Utah; United States
- Coordinates: 40°46′5.96″N 111°53′33.11″W
- Opened: August 2, 1980
- Closed: 2007
- Developer: Crossroads Plaza Associates
- Floors: 4

Crossroads Plaza was a shopping mall in downtown Salt Lake City, Utah, United States that operated from 1980 to 2007, before being demolished to make way for City Creek Center.

The mall was developed by a consortium, called Crossroads Plaza Associates. In 2003, the mall was purchased by the Church of Jesus Christ of Latter-day Saints (LDS Church), which also owned the neighboring ZCMI Center Mall. The church replaced both malls with City Creek Center to prevent urban decay near its downtown headquarters (including Temple Square).

== Location ==
The mall covered the majority of block 76, which is bounded by Main Street on the east, South Temple on the north, West Temple on the west, and 100 South on the south.

== Construction ==
Initially, the mall's construction was met with concerns over traffic, as it was built directly across the street from the newly opened ZCMI Center Mall, along with concerns over the destruction of historic buildings in the heart of downtown. Most prominent was the Amussen Jewelry Building, one of the last remaining commercial buildings from the Mormon pioneer era. The city approved the destruction of the Amussen building with the requirement that its façade be preserved and subsequently integrated into the new mall.

The mall's developer was Crossroads Plaza Associates, a consortium made up of Equitable Life Assurance Society of the US, Foulger Properties, and Okland Properties. The consortium requested that the city's redevelopment agency procure eight properties for the project, while most of the remaining land used was leased from Zions Securities Corporation. The city also vacated the road running through the block, known as Richards Street, and leased it to the developer so the mall could be built overtop.

Most approvals were granted by June 1978 and construction began in earnest that summer.

== Operations ==
The mall opened to the public on August 2, 1980. (Note: Some parts of the mall opened prior to the August 2, 1980 grand opening. For example, Crossroads Cinema opened on June 20 and the bank opened on July 23.) Several dignitaries were present at the ribbon-cutting, including Utah governor Scott M. Matheson, Salt Lake Mayor Ted Wilson, LDS Church President Ezra Taft Benson and his wife Flora (she was a daughter of pioneer jeweler Carl Amussen, whose historic building façade had been saved and incorporated into the mall). One of the mall's major tenants, Weinstock's, brought in Disney characters for a celebration parade.

At its opening, there were two major tenants, Weinstock's and Nordstrom. The mall contained four levels with 2,100,000 square feet (200,000 m^{2}), and cost $100 million to construct (equivalent to $390,751,212 in 2025). The lower level was known as the Richards Street Marketplace, which included specialty shops and boutiques, along with eateries and the three-auditorium Crossroads Cinema. Although not officially a part of the mall, the Salt Lake City Marriott Hotel was opened in October 1981 and connected directly to Crossroads Plaza.

=== Commercial Security Bank/Key Bank tower ===
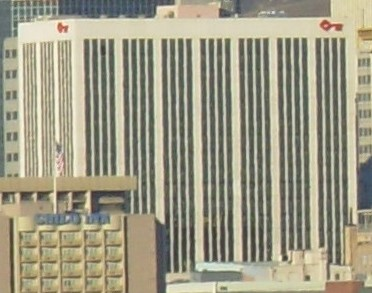
The bank tower, 2006

Included in the mall's construction was an office tower, 20-stories high (16 above the mall level and four in the mall base). The structure was built on a "raft slab" allowing it to "float" on the soil during an earthquake. The tower's main tenant was Commercial Security Bank (CSB), which leased eight levels, along with space on the main floor where it operated a bank branch. The preserved Amussen building façade served as the Main Street entrance to the bank, which opened on July 23, 1980, earlier than most of the rest of the mall.

As CSB held the naming rights for the tower, it was known as the Commercial Security Bank tower or CSB tower. CSB was merged into Key Bank at the end of 1987 and the tower's name was updated to reflect the merger.

== New ownership and demolition ==
By the early 2000s, Crossroads Plaza was struggling with many vacancies. Nordstrom was requesting to move away from Crossroads to The Gateway shopping center a few blocks to the west, and Crossroads Cinemas had closed in June 2000.

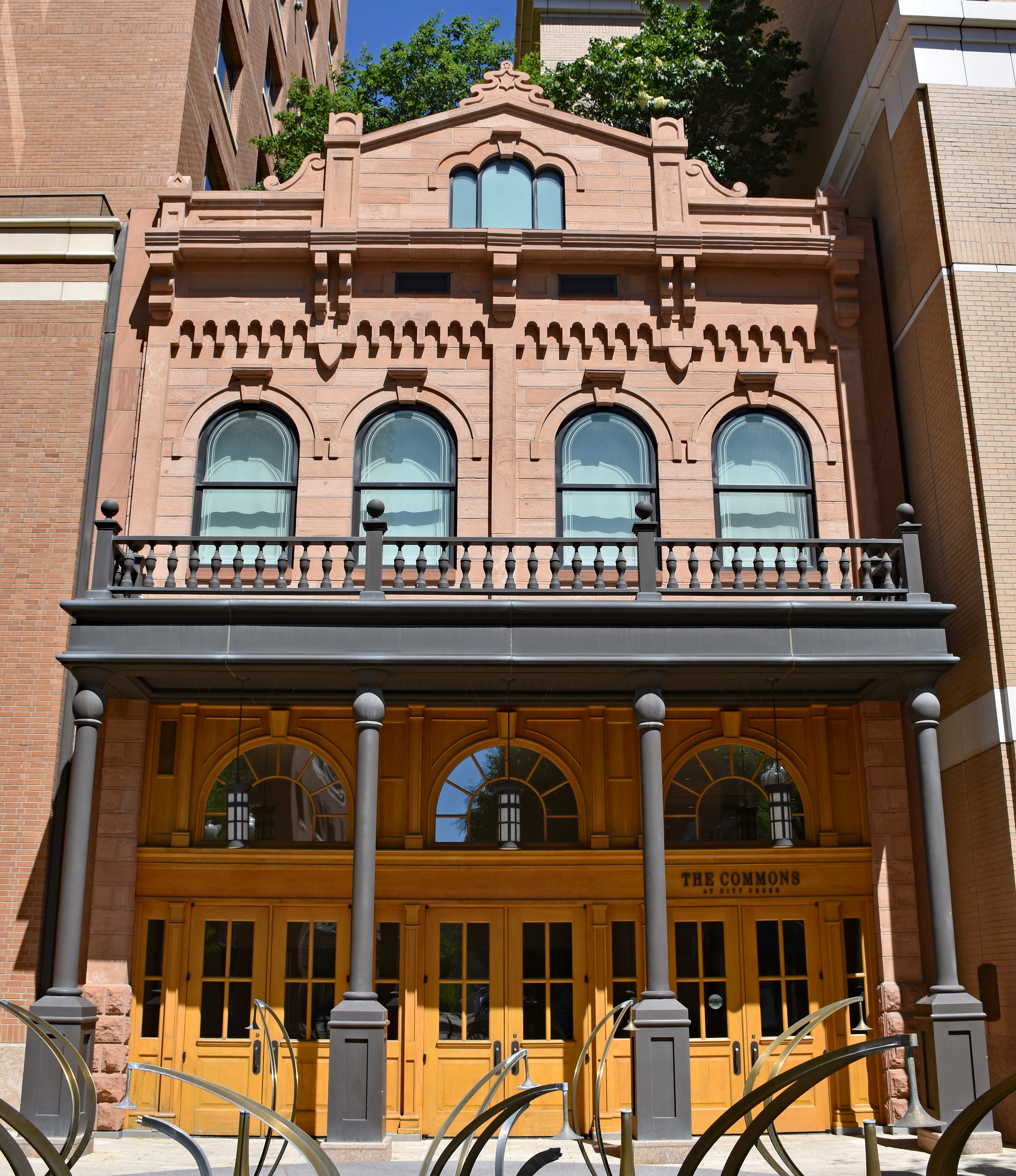
The façade of Amussen's Jewelry was preserved and located on the exterior of Crossroads Plaza, it was later included in City Creek Center (as pictured here)

On March 19, 2003, the Church of Jesus Christ of Latter-day Saints (LDS Church) announced it was planning to purchase the mall. The church, through its real estate arm, already owned much of the land under the mall which it had been leasing. The church had also purchased Richards Street (which the city has leased to Crossroads Plaza) in the 1990s as part of an agreement with the city to bring more greenspace to downtown and build City Creek Park. The church closed on the deal later in 2003, and on October 8 of that year, they presented preliminary plans to significantly remodel both Crossroads Plaza and ZCMI Center Mall. Three years later, on October 3, 2006, the church announced more detailed plans regarding the development. These new plans would no longer preserve the two different downtown malls, but rather demolish them and build a single mall, known as City Creek Center.

By fall 2006, only three stores remained open in Crossroads Plaza. Demolition on the mall's parking structure began in January 2007, with Nordstrom closing in the middle of that month. The Key Bank Tower was demolished via implosion the morning of August 18, 2007, and was the last piece of Crossroads Plaza to be razed.

City Creek Center opened in Crossroad Plaza's place on March 22, 2012.
