= Salt Lake Marriott Downtown at City Creek =

Hotel in Salt Lake City, Utah, U.S.

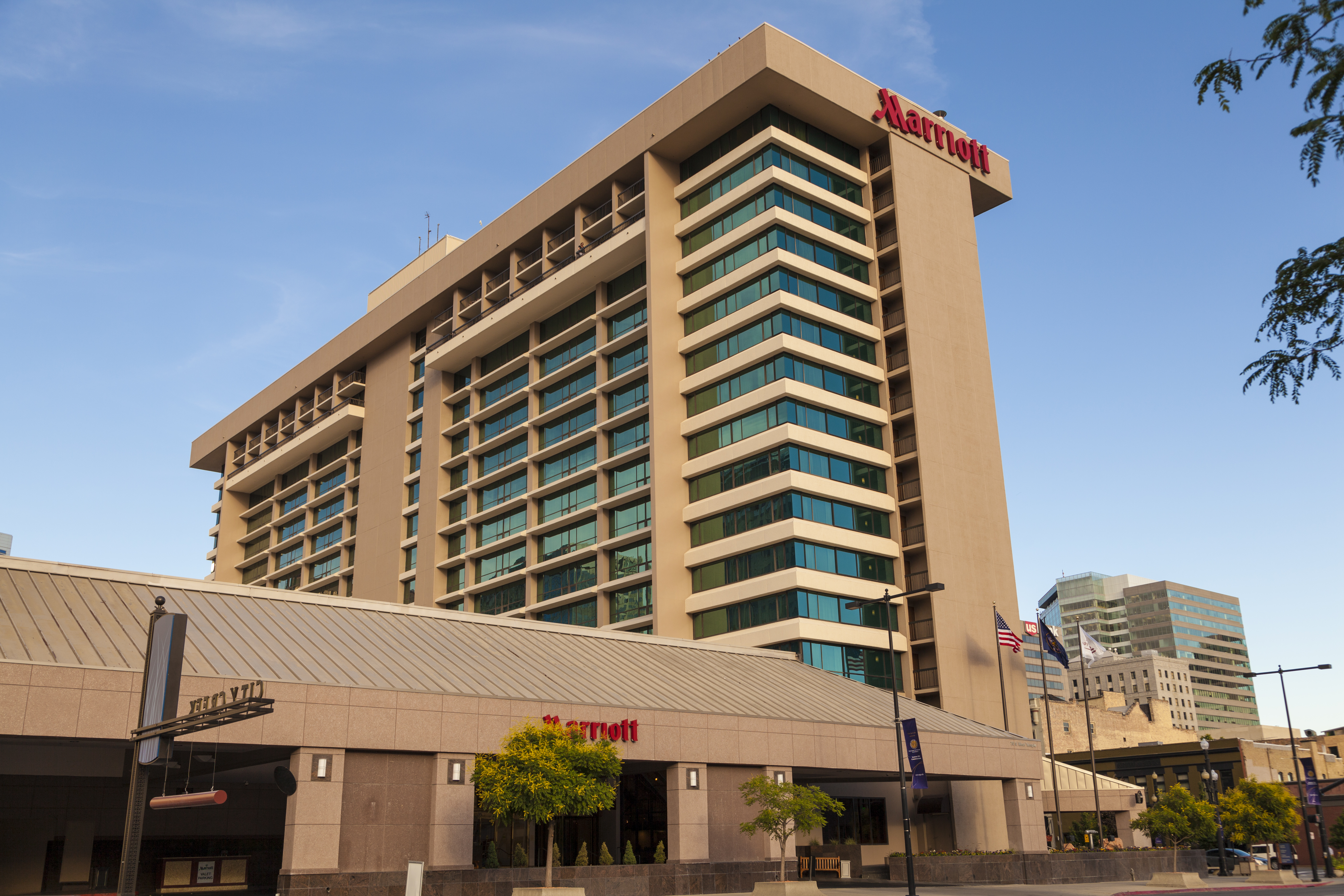
- As seen from West Temple Street
- Interactive map of the Salt Lake Marriott Downtown at City Creek area
- Former names: Salt Lake City Marriott Downtown
- Hotel chain: Marriott International

General information
- Type: Hotel
- Location: Downtown Salt Lake City, 75 South West Temple Street, Salt Lake City, Utah, United States
- Coordinates: 40.767761°N 111.893517°W
- Opened: 15 October 1981
- Inaugurated: 22 October 1981
- Renovated: 2008
- Cost: $21 million
- Renovation cost: $3 million
- Owner: DiamondRock Hospitality Company
- Operator: Marriott International

Other information
- Number of rooms: 510
- Number of restaurants: 1
- Number of bars: 1
- Facilities: 21 meeting rooms

The Salt Lake Marriott Downtown at City Creek is a Marriott International operated hotel located at City Creek Center in downtown Salt Lake City, Utah, United States. The hotel opened as the Salt Lake City Marriott Hotel on October 15, 1981 (with a grand opening on October 22), and was originally connected to Crossroads Plaza mall. In the late 2000s, the hotel underwent a name change and a multimillion-dollar renovation when Crossroads Plaza was razed and replaced with City Creek Center. During the 2002 Winter Olympics, the west side of the building had a full size wrap with the image of an athlete.

== Facilities ==
The Marriott hotel consists of 510 rooms, 21 meeting rooms as well as a bar, a restaurant, a Starbucks, and entertainment facilities. The hotel also has a gym and a fitness center.
