= Native Americans in Utah =

Native American Percentage per County in the US

Indigenous peoples have lived in the area now known as the state of Utah for thousands of years. Today they are divided into five main groups: Utes, Goshutes, Paiutes, Shoshone, and Navajo. Each occupies a different region within the state, many of which regions extend across borders into other states. In the 2010 census, there were a total of 32,927 American Indian and Alaska Natives living within the state, which totaled to 1.19% of the total population of Utah.

== Pre-European arrival ==
Evidence has shown that people have been drawn to areas in Utah as long as 10,000 years ago, specifically in the Escalante Valley in Southern Utah as well as in the Great Basin, near the Utah/Nevada border. The earliest time in Utah's human history is classified by archaeologists as Paleoachaic, which dates back to 11,000 years ago, with evidences of occupation over 11 feet below the current ground level. There is very little information on these times, except that the peoples depended on wild foods to sustain themselves. Hunters had much success in going after deer, beaver, marmots, and even poultry such as ducks, grouse, and turkeys. Different tools were used to capture prey, and after the kill the leftover meat was dried and preserved. The men primarily did the hunting, while the women searched for plants and processed them. Occasionally they participated in small game hunting.

The practice of farming only started to become popular in the first few centuries A.D. and continued until around A.D.1300. In these farms many things were grown such as corn, beans, and squash, meanwhile the practice of hunting and gathering continued. During this period trade also became very important among the people of the Fremont culture and the Anasazi, who inhabited the region. Although much information about these ancient peoples is gained through archaeology, it is only after the arrival of Europeans in the 1700s that their history is preserved through writing.

== Arrival of European settlers ==
=== Spanish explorers ===
Spain was the "owner" of most of the western part of Utah before the westward expansion by the United States. In 1765, Juan Maria Antonia Rivera and his party may have been some of the first Euro-Americans to explore parts of Utah. 11 years later, Dominguez and Escalante traveled through Utah, in what would become a famous expedition. The Spanish "claimed" the land, although the number of Indigenous peoples inhabiting the land far outnumbered the few Spanish explorers.

=== Fur trappers and traders ===
For around the next 85 years mainly fur trappers and traders would pass through the state. Jedediah Smith and Jim Bridger were among the first, later followed by Peter Skene Ogden, Miles Goodyear, and Etienne Provost. The relations between the trappers and Natives were varied, some were friendly and some were hostile. Over time, the trappers and traders learned to communicate better with the Natives, first through signs and later on some even learned their native tongues and intermarried with the Native women.

=== Mormon pioneers ===
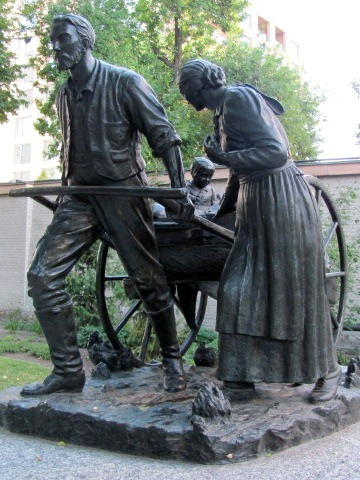
Mormon Pioneer handcart statue

July 24, 1847 is recognized as the day the Mormon Pioneers entered into the Salt Lake Valley. This day is now a holiday celebrated in Utah, known as Pioneer Day. However, when the Mormon Pioneers arrived, they did not happen onto an empty landscape. It is estimated that around 20,000 Native Americans already inhabited the land now encompassed by the boundaries of Utah.

The first few years of settlement, the relations were generally peaceful and some trading occurred. As the pioneers would settle the land beyond the Salt Lake Valley, the Native Americans became more displaced and tensions started to arise. Although most conflicts were resolved peacefully, this was the start of the deterioration of the relations. In 1853 the Walker War was started, and was then followed by the Black Hawk War in 1865. Once the 1870s began, federal policy on Native American relations began to be enacted in a more organized manner, which created less personal disputes among the Natives and the settlers. This was the start of a period of around 100 years with many different policies and practices regarding the Native Americans in Utah and across the country.

== Contemporary situation ==
=== Education ===
Since 1900, fifty percent of Native Americans have been enrolled in public school. The government did not want a large need for Indian reservations so they used public schools as a way to assimilate Native Americans into white culture. The idea was that the Native Americans would leave their culture behind by assimilating to white culture. Overall, the feeling of white Utah residents regarding the integration of Native Americans was not positive. Many teachers were openly against the integration and that made school difficult for Native Americans. The hostility was in part because Native Americans lived on non-taxable reservations so they did not pay taxes for school. There were reported incidents of bus drivers not picking up Native American students. Racism was present in the school system. This problem continued for Native American children until the Indian Education Act of 1972. This helped some Native American children but a lot of Native American children dropped out of school before this.

=== Government and sovereignty ===
The history of Native American sovereignty is usually divided into four categories: aboriginal culture and sovereignty in pre-Columbian times, movement of Native Americans onto reservations, assimilation through policy passed by Congress, and modern efforts of the Native Americans to establish sovereignty in Indian Country. This history has created much confusion between the distinction of Native American sovereignty and the powers of the federal government. They were recognized as individual nations with treaty-making powers, with the right to their land and to govern however they desire, but also the process of assimilation sought to dissolve these powers.

The lands in the state of Utah designated for Native Americans are reserved from "settlement, entry, sale, or other disposition and set aside of the use and benefit of [the Goshute] and other Indians on the public domain in the State of Utah".

The 1975 Indian Self Determination and Education Assistance Act, which has allowed the tribes greater freedom in governing themselves through the administering of federal programs and having more control over their resources.

=== Reservations ===
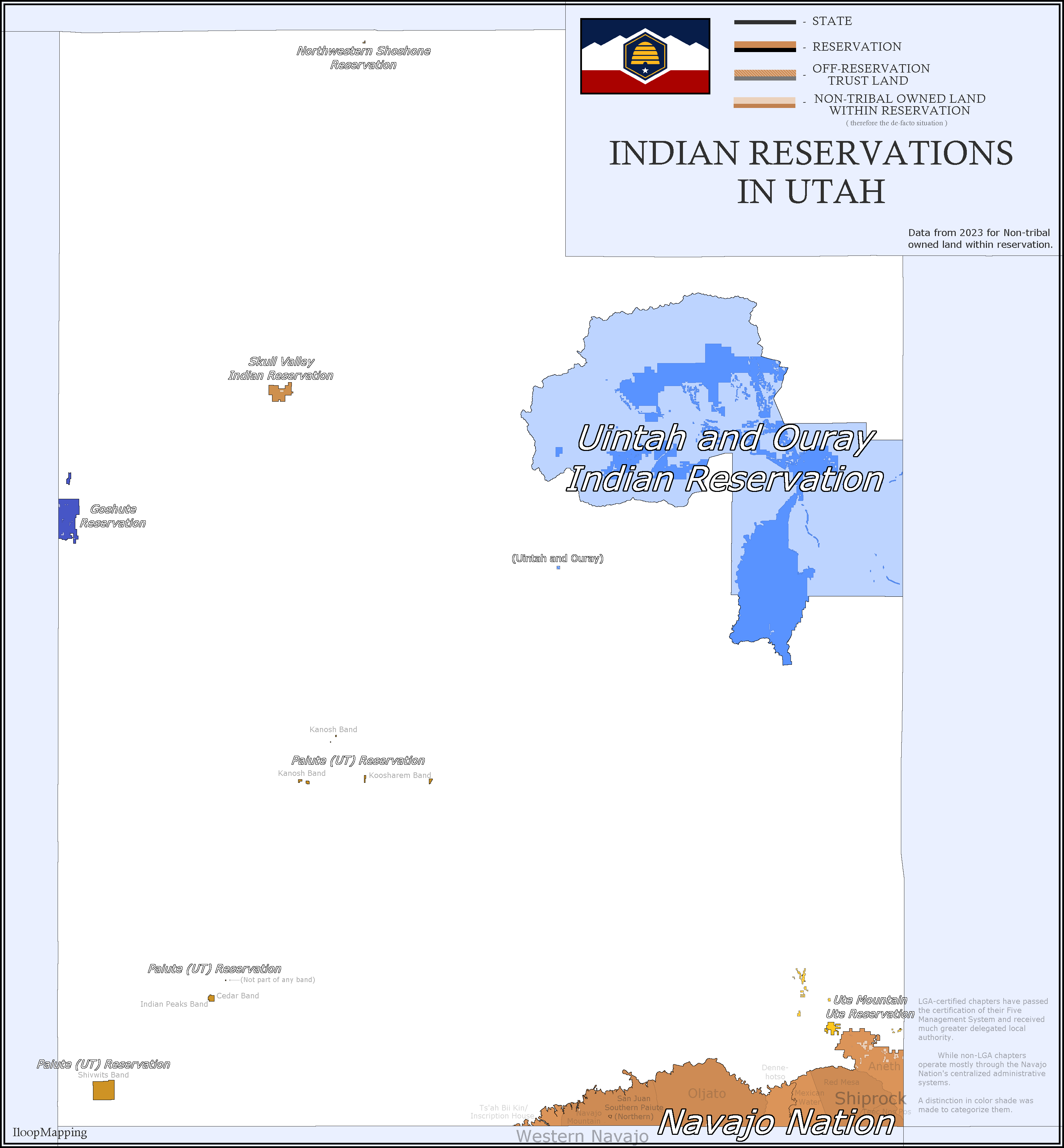
Map of the Indian reservations in Utah.

Indian Reservations are places that are designated as places for Indigenous people to live. These places are run by the government of a specific Indigenous Nation instead of the state governments of the United States of America. Federally recognized tribes govern the reservations. These tribes have a government-to-government relationship with the United States of America. Reservations in Utah include The Skull Valley Reservation which is located in Tooele County, Utah. The Goshute people are the federally recognized tribe there. There is also the Uintah and Ouray Indian Reservation, on which the Ute tribe is the federally recognized tribe to govern the land. This reservation is the second-largest in the US and is located in the Uintah, Duchesne, Wasatch, Grand, Carbon, Utah and Emery counties in Utah. Not all indigenous people that live in Utah live on Indian Reservations. About 46% of indigenous people in Utah live in urban Salt Lake. Many also live in Weber, Utah, and Davis counties. The majority of the remaining 54% of the indigenous people in Utah live on the reservations.

== Cultures ==
=== Ute ===
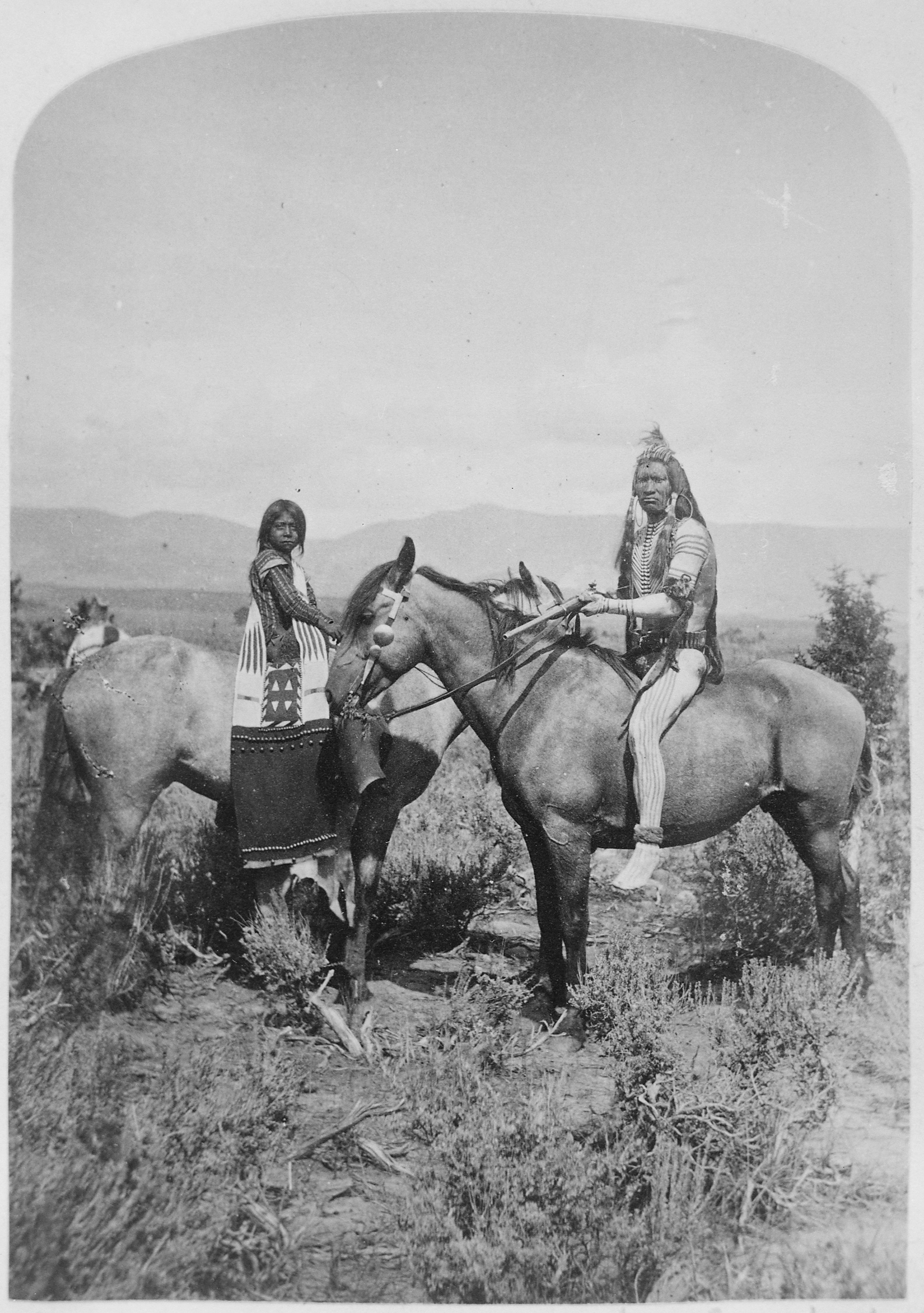
Uinta Ute warrior and his bride on horseback, northwest Utah, 1874

The Ute people are native to the states of Arizona, Utah, Colorado, Nevada, New Mexico, and Wyoming. The language they speak is Shoshonean. They are ancestors of Uto-Aztecs and the people are now divided up into groups called bands. The bands of the Ute People include The Mouache, The Caputa, The Weenuchiu, The White River Ute, and The Pahvant.

The Ute people used many different strategies to acquire food for their families. They would gather food from wild plants. Also the men would typically hunt larger animals while women would trap smaller animals. There were some bands of the Ute people that began to farm, while others discovered how to use plants for medicine.

=== Goshute ===
The Goshute people are native to the Great Salt Lake Desert in Utah. They were very effective hunters and gatherers in this desert region. In their tradition, they believe to have always lived in the Great Salt Lake Desert. Living in the desert region provided some benefits for the Goshutes, such as not being bothered by white settlers until the middle of the 1800s when Mormon settlers arrived. When this happened they were pushed out of their territory.

=== Paiute ===
The Paiute people are native to Utah and were a nomadic people that traveled quite frequently. Their original territory covered 30 million acres, in which they moved around following the seasons and animal migration. The first recorded contact between Paiutes and Europeans in the area that would later become Utah was in 1776 when the Domínguez–Escalante expedition encountered a group of Paiute women gathering seeds. The Paiutes were relatively unharmed by European settlement until the 1850s when Mormon settlers came to their territory. The most notable interaction between Paiutes and the Mormons was in 1857 during the Mountain Meadows Massacre. After this massacre, the Paiute people have been very vocal about not being involved, while the Mormons at the time of the incident blamed them.

=== Shoshone ===
The Shoshone people are native to Wyoming, Idaho, and Utah. The name Shoshone originates from a word from their own language, the plural of the term for a type of high-growing grass; they are sometimes referred to as the "Grass House People". The Shoshone people are native to the Great Basin area. They were mainly a hunter-and-gatherer type of people, with bison meat being their most important resource.

=== Navajo ===
The Navajo people are native to the southwestern states of New Mexico, Arizona, Utah, and Colorado. They are the second-largest federally recognized tribe in the country with 300,000 people enrolled as Navajo. The people were largely hunters and gatherers but eventually adopted farming techniques. The Navajo people originally lived in places that are now modern-day Mexico but when Spanish explorers came they were pushed back to Southern Utah and other southwest states.
