= Torleif S. Knaphus =

American sculptor

Torleif Severin Knaphus
- Historical photo of Torleif S. Knaphus
- Born: December 14, 1881; Vats, Rogaland, Norway
- Died: June 14, 1965 (aged 83); Salt Lake City, Utah, U.S.
- Resting place: Salt Lake City Cemetery
- Education: Norwegian National Academy of Craft and Art Industry, Académie Julian
- Occupations: Artist and sculptor
- Spouse(s): Emilia Helena Christensen (6 children); Rebecca Marie Jacobson (6 children)

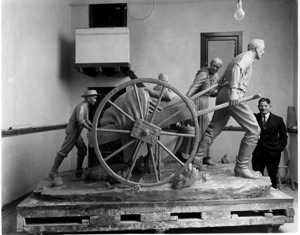
Knaphus in his studio, posing with his 1947 Handcart Monument

Torleif Severin Knaphus (14 December 1881 – 14 June 1965) was a Norwegian-born artist and sculptor in Utah, primarily known for sculptures for and about the Church of Jesus Christ of Latter-day Saints (LDS Church).

== Early life ==
Knaphus was born 14 December 1881 in Vats, Rogaland, Norway. His parents were Lars Larsen Slottenaa Knaphus (born: 1843, died: October 17, 1919) and Liva Sakariassen Alfseike Knaphus (born in Vats/Vass, Rogaland County, Norway, 14 March 1847; died December 18, 1914).

At age 14 Knaphus took out an apprenticeship in a paint and decorating shop in Haugesund. At 17 he went to sea for a year, then completed his apprenticeship in "decoration painting," earning his master's slip, which entitled him to be bonded and open his own shop.

Knaphus was accepted for study under Harriet Backer at her famous art school (in Oslo) and also attended the Royal Art School where he learned sculpturing from Lars Utne.

While in Oslo, Knaphus converted to the LDS Church in 1902, and after completing his studies, migrated to Salt Lake City in 1906.

After his immigration, Knaphus married Helena "Millie" Christensen in the Salt Lake Temple in 1909. Together they moved to Sanpete County, where Knaphus and his brother painted houses to support the family.

When his brother was called to serve as a LDS missionary, Knaphus decided to get more art training in 1913, where he studied sculpting in Paris at the Académie Julian for a year. After completing his studies in Paris, Knaphus spent six months in New York and then in Chicago studying at the Art Students' League to obtain additional skills in sculpting monuments.

=== Handcart Monument ===
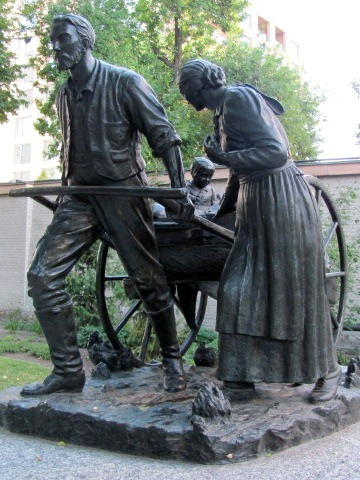
The Handcart Pioneer Monument, located on Temple Square in Salt Lake City, Utah

Daughters of the Utah Handcart Pioneers commissioned in 1924. He started by making a five-inch-high scale clay model, which was then copied into a three-foot-high bronze. It was unveiled 25 September 1926 by Heber J. Grant. Guests of honor at unveiling included handcart pioneers Alfred Burningham and Michael Jensen. The work was kept inside the old Temple Square Bureau of Information building.

"[I]n 1938 Church leaders commissioned Torleif to make a heroic size copy for the pioneer centennial. By 1942 he finished the huge clay model and had the monument cast in bronze in New York. In 1947 the larger-than-life statue was unveiled on Temple Square".

Coralville, Iowa copy by sculptor Stanley J. Watts.

=== Hill Cumorah Monument ===
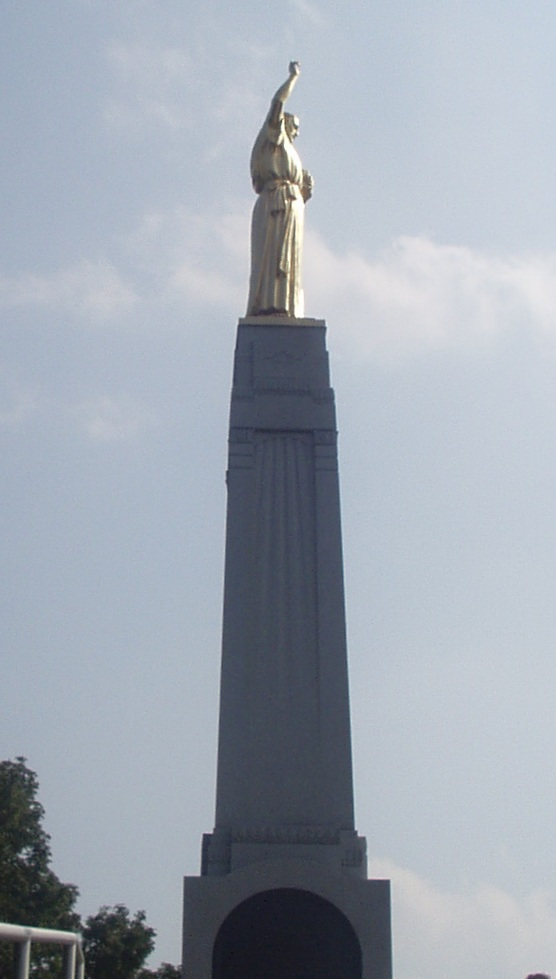

When Knaphus learned that the LDS Church had acquired the Hill Cumorah property, he decided that there need to be a memorial there. After working worked through seven designs, he presented them to leaders of the LDS Church as part of an unsolicited offer to create a monument there. Knaphus later claimed that the Quorum of the Twelve Apostles independently selected the same design that he had been informed through personal revelation was the correct one.

A plaque at the site describes some of the symbolism of the monument, while Knaphus's own "Description of the Hill Cumorah Monument" details more meaning behind the design. The wording on the north sided of the monument titled "Exhortation of Moroni" is the text of Moroni 10:4, which Knaphus carefully shaped by hand, just as he had the other sculpted panels. His young daughter questioned the artist for just having words on this last panel, suggesting that he do another "pretty" panel instead. His reply was: "Dear, this is the prettiest panel of all, and I hope that one day you'll come to understand, like I have, the true meaning of these special words."

The model for the body of the Angel Moroni was not used for the face; instead the model's father was selected out of a crowd, without Knaphus knowing of the relationship between the two men until they posed together for the first time.

He made two visits to the site: first was in the summer of 1934 with Sylvester Q. Cannon, LDS Church presiding bishop, to decide the exact placement and orientation of the monument. The second was when the monument was erected dedicated on 21 July 1935 by Heber J. Grant. In remarks during the ceremony David O. McKay stated "There is no monument in the world today with which greater things are associated."

=== Angel Moroni statues ===
- "His eleven-and-a-half-foot gilded aluminum Moroni graced the top of the old Washington, D. C., chapel, perhaps the only LDS chapel to ever have a statue on its top, until that chapel was sold..." This statue is currently on display in the Church History Museum as an example of the variety of Moroni statues in use by the LDS Church, and was replicated for temples in: Boston, Idaho Falls, and Atlanta (until it was hit by lightning then replaced)
- Statue for the Los Angeles California Temple of a different design; this started a short trend to depict Moroni holding the plates in statues for temples, which was followed by a couple of other artists, then stopped.

=== For temples ===
- Laie Hawaii Temple — "During his first year back he was hired by the [LDS] Church to work on the Hawaiian Temple (constructed 1915–19). For half a year he did interior work and helped Avard Fairbanks sculpture the twelve oxen supporting the basement baptismal font." Also touched-up mural paintings inside the temple.
- Cardston Alberta Temple — "Soon another new temple, this one at Cardston, Alberta (constructed 1913–23), required his skills. There he carefully crafted the model for the baptismal oxen. In later years he judged this to be his all-time favorite font creation. Then, when temple exterior work began, he returned to Cardston and sculptured a large bas relief ... "Christ the Fountainhead." It depicts the Savior and the Samaritan woman at the well ... "
- Mesa Arizona Temple — "For the Arizona Temple, dedicated in 1927, Torleif produced ... [t]he twelve terra cotta (baked clay) oxen beneath the baptismal font ... [and] the eight detailed friezes ... forming an ornamental band around the tops of the north and south outside walls."
- Idaho Falls Idaho Temple — Oxen and font
- Los Angeles California Temple — assisted with sculpture work for the temple and grounds, including Angel Moroni
- Oakland California Temple — helped with the baptismal font

=== Other works ===
- Sculpture:
  - Joseph Receiving the Plates from the Angel Moroni Monument
  - "Asleep" (commissioned by a mausoleum in Los Angeles
  - "School Children's Monument" (bronze) on Washington Square close to the west entrance of the Salt Lake City and County Building
  - numerous smaller statues: Utah Girl; Pioneer man and woman; Joan of Arc; Joy to the Hills; small "Mormon Meteor" speed car.
- Bas reliefs:
  - Edgehill Ward meetinghouse in Sugarhouse has a replica of the "Christ the Fountainhead" bas relief on the exterior of the building and two smaller bas reliefs in the building's interior. The exterior relief is still visible on 15th East (right across from Christmas Street—about 1750 South) and has been painted. Other locations of this relief includes: Provo Temple; and Chapels in Tremonton; Belvedere; Rose Park; Yale; Las Vegas; Wittier; and others.
  - Whittier Ward meetinghouse in Salt Lake City has a bas relief by Knaphus in the chapel entitled "Joseph's First Prayer" depicting the First Vision of Joseph Smith.
  - Bingham Copper Mine relief at Kennecott Copper Mine Visitors Center
  - Mining relief at Bingham High School
  - Deseret Mortuary - "Visions"
  - small plaques: Handcart Pioneers and Covered Wagon (different sizes); Fur Traders; Restoration of the Aaronic and Melchizedek Priesthoods; and Joseph Smith Receiving the Plates.
- Busts:
  - Bust of Brigham Young, rotunda of the Utah State Capitol, 24 July 1956 by donation of Sons of Utah Pioneers
  - Governor Simon Bamberger (at the Lagoon Amusement Park)
  - Heber J. Grant (Hall of the Prophets, LDS Conference Center)
  - 21 other busts of civic and LDS Church leaders
- Decorative molding and interior painting:
  - Rotunda of Holy Trinity Cathedral, Greek Orthodox Church
  - Capitol Theater (Salt Lake City)
  - Utah Theatre
  - Kingsbury Hall, University of Utah
  - the large rosette on the ceiling of the Salt Lake Temple's celestial room
  - decorative work in the Salt Lake Tabernacle and other LDS Church buildings

== Personal life ==
His first wife, Millie, died suddenly in 1931 while there were "six children at home, the youngest just fifteen months old." "He remained single for eight years, taking the youngest child to work with him and trying his best to be both father and mother to children." "In 1940, when he was fifty-eight, he married twenty-three-year-old Rebecca Marie Jacobson. She courageously helped raise his children and in time bore him six more."

He died 14 June 1965 and was buried in the Salt Lake City Cemetery.

=== Genealogy ===
At the time of his conversion to the LDS Church, Knaphus gathered names of his ancestors whose names he could take to the temple. Before emigrating, he returned to his home parish twice for a total of seven months to gather names. He returned for an additional two months after studying in Paris and before going to New York. "At his funeral LeGrand Richards, of the Quorum of the Twelve, said that he knew of no single man in the Church who had done more genealogy work than Torleif Knaphus."

A reporter from "Time" magazine was in his studio to interview Knaphus and asked what his greatest work was in life. The reply was that his large family pedigree chart and his family is his greatest work in life. Throughout his life he gathered over 10,000 names of his Norwegian relatives—some back to the original kings of Norway.

== Memorials ==
- 7-foot (2.1 m) monument on the original Knapphus farm site in Norway including a bas relief of the Handcart Pioneers. Today, Knaphus is spelled with two "p"'s.
- Copy of Handcart Monument (original 1/2 life size) in Norwegian Emigrant Museum (Norsk Utvandrermuseum), Hamar, Norway
- Copy of his "Woman at the Well" relief in boy-hood Lutheran church in Vats
