= List of botanical gardens and arboretums in Utah =

This list of botanical gardens and arboretums in Utah is intended to include all significant botanical gardens and arboretums in the US state of Utah

Name	Image	Affiliation	City
Brigham Young University Arboretum (Harrison Arboretum)		Brigham Young University	Provo
Conservation Garden Park		Jordan Valley Water Conservancy District	West Jordan
International Peace Gardens			Salt Lake City
Orem City Arboretum	An aerial photo of the park showing the trees, some with orange leaves, with the houses in the background.	Orem City	Orem
Petersen Arboretum			Alpine
Red Butte Garden and Arboretum		University of Utah	Salt Lake City
Red Hills Desert Garden		Washington County Water Conservancy District	St. George
Robert L. Shepherd Desert Arboretum			Santa Clara
State Arboretum of Utah		University of Utah	Salt Lake City
Utah Botanical Center		Utah State University	Kaysville

== See also ==
- List of botanical gardens and arboretums in the United States
