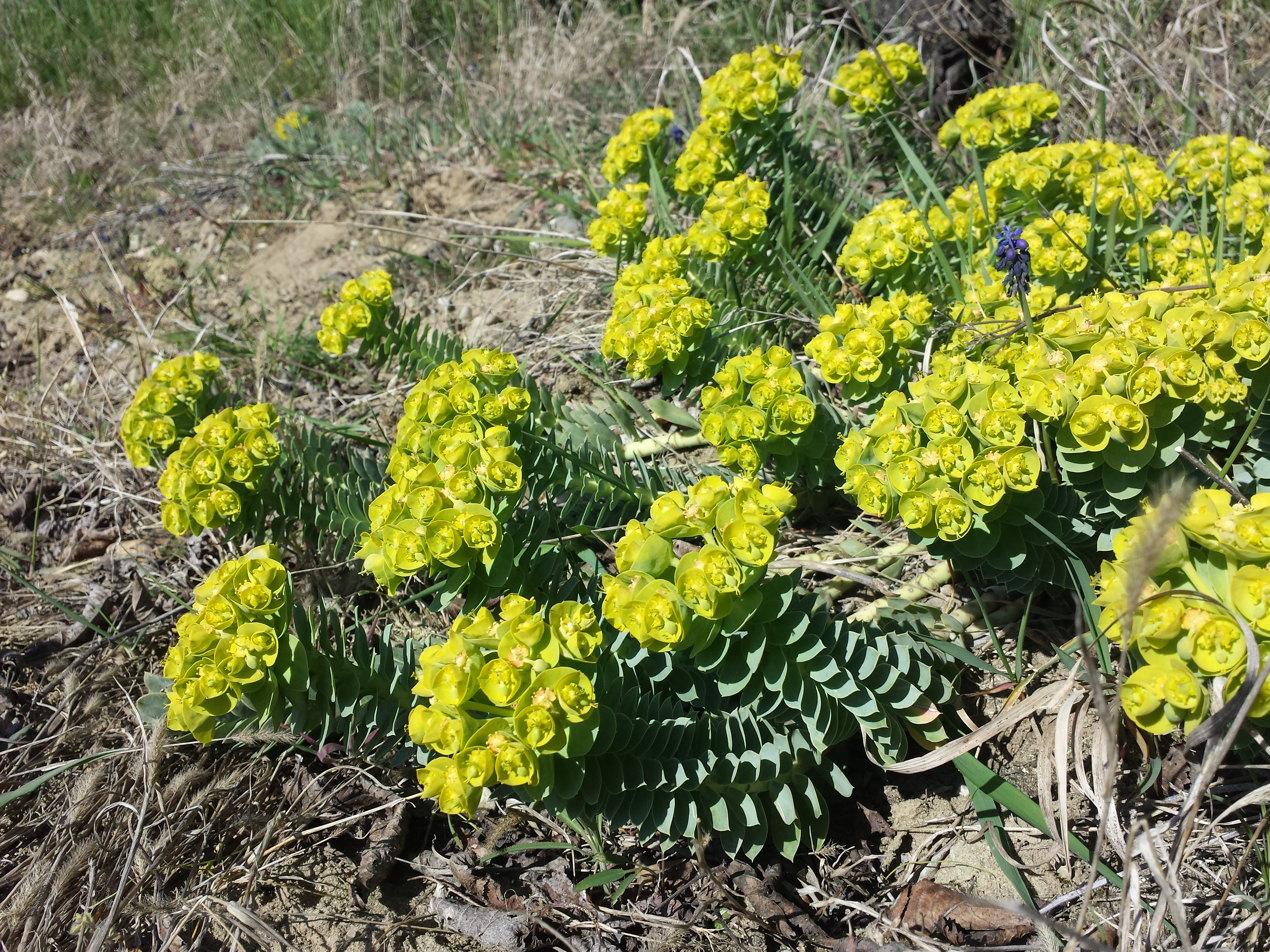

Scientific classification
- Kingdom: Plantae
- Clade: Tracheophytes
- Clade: Angiosperms
- Clade: Eudicots
- Clade: Rosids
- Order: Malpighiales
- Family: Euphorbiaceae
- Genus: Euphorbia
- Species: E. myrsinites

Binomial name
- Euphorbia myrsinites L. (1753)

Subspecies
- Euphorbia myrsinites subsp. myrsinites; Euphorbia myrsinites subsp. rechingeri (Greuter) Aldén

Synonyms
- Endoisila myrsinites (L.) Raf. (1838); Euphorbion myrsinitum (L.) St.-Lag. (1880); Galarhoeus myrsinites (L.) Haw. (1812); Murtekias myrsinites (L.) Raf. (1838); Tithymalus myrsinites (L.) Hill (1768)

= Euphorbia myrsinites =

Species of flowering plant in the spurge family

Euphorbia myrsinites, the myrtle spurge, blue spurge, or broad-leaved glaucous-spurge, is a succulent species of flowering plant in the spurge family Euphorbiaceae.

== Distribution ==
The plant is native to southeastern Europe and Asia Minor, from the Balearic Islands and Italy east through the Balkans to Crimea, Turkey, the Caucasus, and Iran.

== Etymology ==
The specific epithet myrsinites is derived from the Greek word μυρσινίτης (myrsinites), which was used in Dioscorides's De Materia Medica to describe its similarity to μυρσίνη (myrsine), aka myrtle (Myrtus communis).

== Description ==
Myrtle spurge is an evergreen perennial. It has sprawling stems growing to 20–40 cm (7.9–16 in) long. The leaves are spirally arranged, fleshy, pale glaucous bluish-green, 1–2 cm long. The flowers are inconspicuous, but surrounded by bright sulphur-yellow bracts (tinged red in the cultivar 'Washfield'); they are produced during the spring.

Plants spread primarily by seed and are capable of projecting seed up to 15 feet (4.6 m).

=== Toxicity ===
The plant's milky sap can cause significant skin and eye irritation in humans and may cause blindness with contact with the eyes. The plant causes nausea, vomiting, and diarrhea when ingested. Goggles, gloves and protective gear is often used when removing plants. Children are more susceptible than adults to symptoms from myrtle spurge, suggesting play areas not in proximity to the species. Pets can have similar reactions to myrtle spurge sap exposure.

== Subspecies ==
Two subspecies are accepted.

- Euphorbia myrsinites subsp. myrsinites – southern Europe to Turkey, the Caucasus, and Iran
- Euphorbia myrsinites subsp. rechingeri (Greuter) Aldén (synonym Euphorbia rechingeri Greuter) – Crete

== Cultivation ==
Euphorbia myrsinites is cultivated as an ornamental plant for its distinctive silver-gray foliage, and is used in garden borders, 'modernist' mass plantings, and as a potted plant. It is planted in drought tolerant gardens in California and other dry climates.

In the United Kingdom, the cultivated plant has gained the Royal Horticultural Society's Award of Garden Merit.

== Noxious weed ==
Euphorbia myrsinites is identified as a noxious weed and/or invasive species in some regions.

- Its cultivation is illegal in the U.S. state of Colorado, where it is classified as a Class A noxious weed, and landowners are legally required to eradicate it.
- Myrtle spurge is also classified as a noxious weed in the U.S. state of Oregon, subject to quarantine.
- It was listed as a noxious weed in Salt Lake County, Utah in 2007, and since has been illegal for sale within the county. Salt Lake County landowners and land managers are legally responsible to contain, control, or eradicate the species on their property. The Utah Native Plant Society has also formally recommended it be listed as a Utah state noxious weed.

=== Control ===
Physical control
Small infestations can be controlled through multiple years of digging up at least 4" of the root. Myrtle spurge is best controlled in the spring when the soil is moist and prior to seed production. Make sure to dispose of all the plant parts in the garbage instead of composting.

Chemical control
Myrtle spurge can be effectively controlled with products containing 2, 4-D and dicamba applied in late fall.

Biological control
There are currently no known bio-controls, though the leafy spurge flea beetle (Aphthona), has had a high survival rate on myrtle spurge in laboratory studies.
