= Red Hills Desert Garden =

Botanical garden in Utah

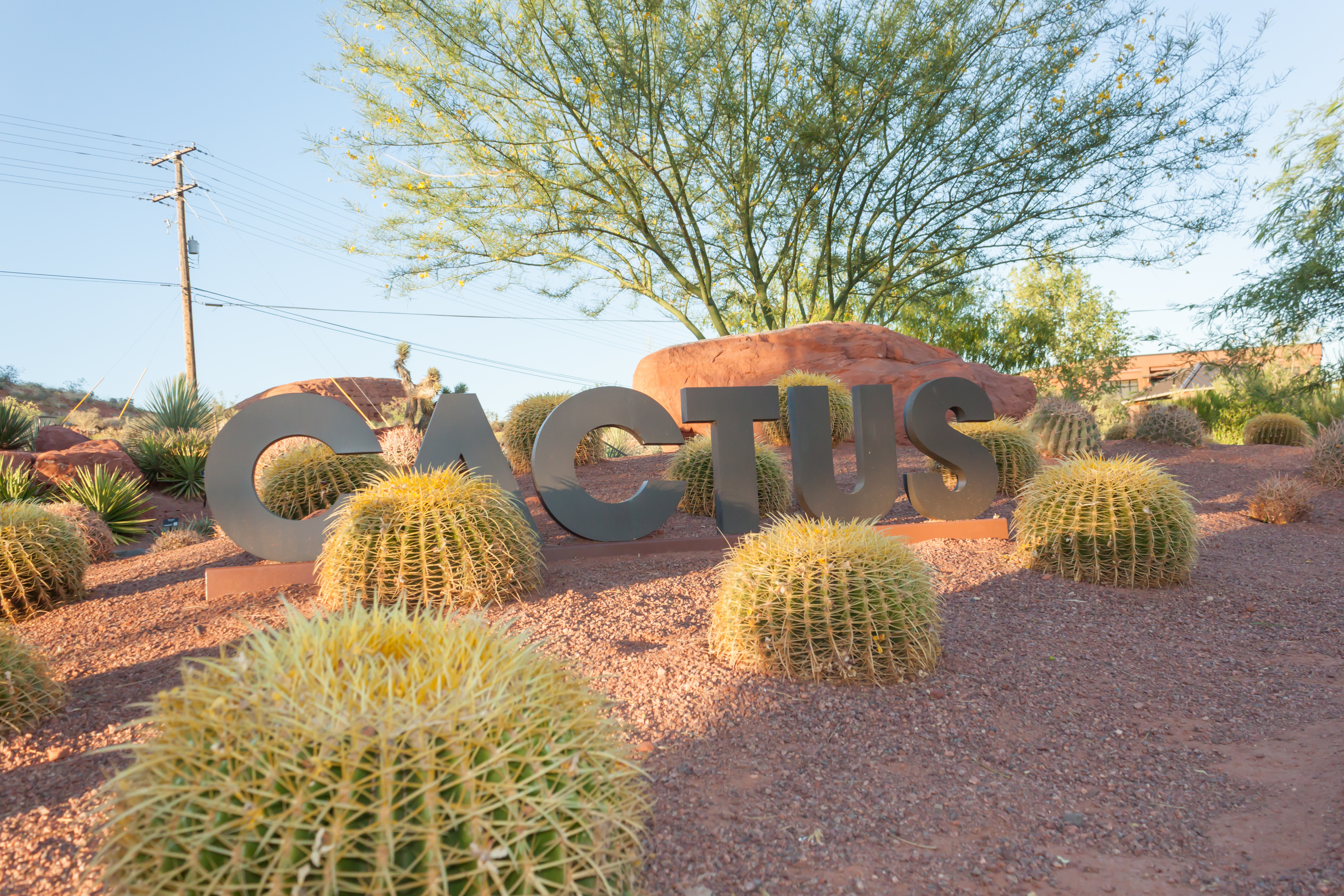
- A display of golden barrel cactuses at the garden in 2017

- Location within Utah Location within the United States
- Type: Botanical garden
- Location: 375 E Red Hills Pkwy, St. George, UT 84770
- Coordinates: 37.1144°N 113.5752°W
- Area: 4.5 acres (1.8 ha)
- Opened: May 20, 2015; 11 years ago
- Owner: Washington County Water Conservancy District; City of St. George; Virgin River Program
- Visitors: 150,000 (in 2022)
- Open: 6AM-10PM
- Plants: 5,000
- Species: 333
- Budget: $3.7 million (2015)
- Website: redhillsdesertgarden.com

The Red Hills Desert Garden is a xeriscaped botanical garden in St. George, Utah. It is known for its collection of desert-adapted plants and fossil tracks in a water-conserving landscape. It has free admission and dogs are allowed on a leash. The garden is a joint collaboration between the Washington County Water Conservancy District, City of St. George, and the Virgin River Program. Established in 2015, it aims to educate visitors about irrigation systems and proper watering techniques.

== History ==
The park opened on May 20, 2015. It had to close from August 22 to 26 in 2016 due to illegally introduced fish such as goldfish, green sunfish, and mosquitofish being placed in the river. The procedure cost between $5,000 to $10,000 and 1,000 invasive fish were removed before it was decided that the stream was to be drained and treated, with the native fish being moved out temporarily.

== Features ==
The garden also features a 1,150 ft (350 m) long stream intersecting the park laterally that is stocked with both native and endangered species of fish, such as the Virgin spinedace, flannelmouth sucker, woundfin, speckled dace, desert sucker, and Virgin chub. A fish viewing area is located in a replica of a slot canyon. The fossilized tracks from dinosaurs such as Megapnosaurus, Dilophosaurus, and Scutellosaurus in the garden may date back to 200 million years ago. The park is additionally right next to a 62,000 acres (25,000 ha) preserve for desert tortoises called the Red Cliffs Desert Reserve.

Due to it being a xeriscaped garden and not using much turf, it saves an average of 5,000,000 US gal (19,000,000 L) yearly. It is decorated with lights for the Christmas season annually. The park has seven separate displays of plants: sage, Hesperaloe, Agave, native, Yucca, cactus, and flower. A full list of plants in the garden can be found here.

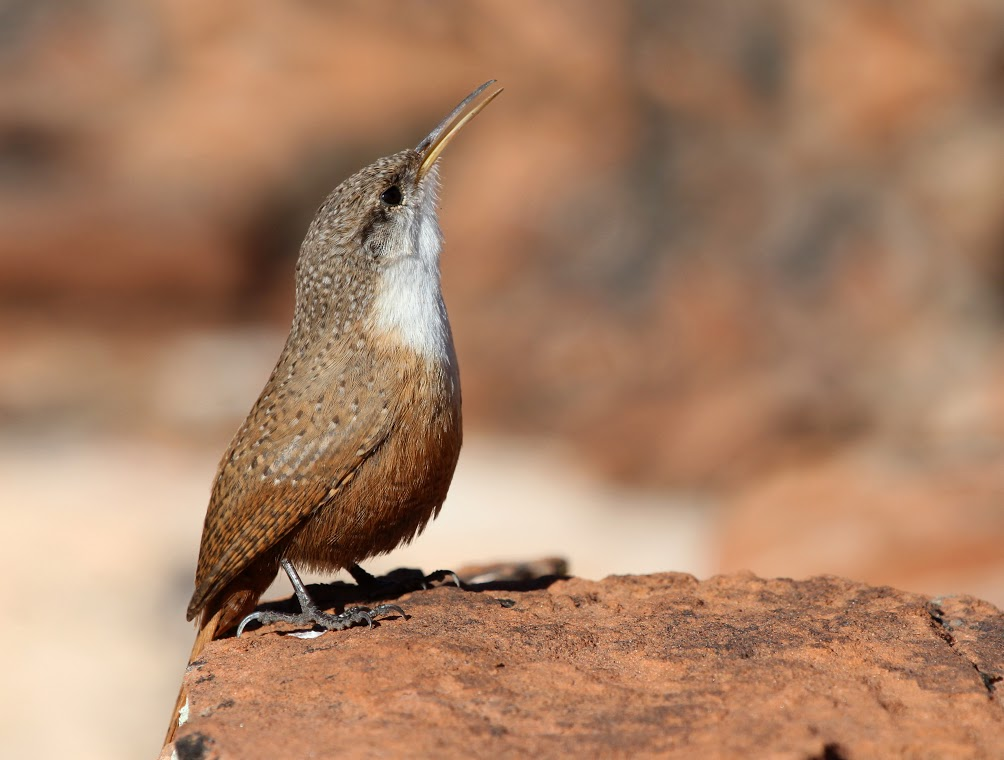
A canyon wren at the garden

== See also ==
- List of botanical gardens and arboretums in the United States
