= Conservation Garden Park =

Park in West Jordan, Utah, US

Coordinates: 40°36′05″N 111°55′37″W

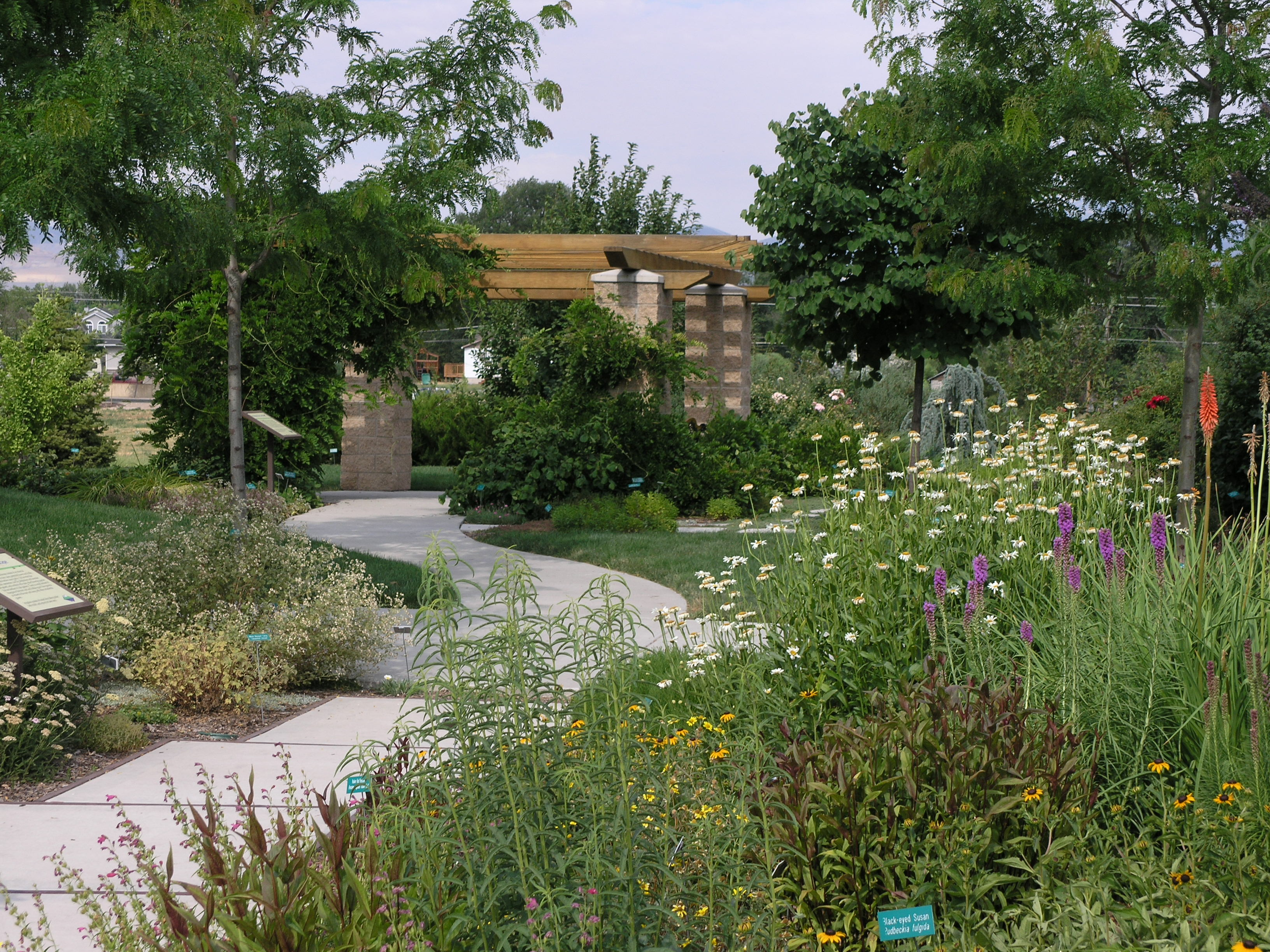
- A demonstration garden located in the park.
- Interactive map of Conservation Garden Park
- Location: 8215 South 1300 West, West Jordan, Utah
- Area: 6 acres (2.4 ha)
- Website: Official website

Conservation Garden Park is located on the grounds of Jordan Valley Water Conservancy District at 8215 South 1300 West, West Jordan, Utah. The project consists of approximately six acres of demonstration gardens and waterwise landscape exhibits and the new Education Center which was completed and opened to the public in summer 2011. The Center is designed to LEED Platinum standards, showcases environmental building technologies, and broadens the theme of the gardens to include conservation of energy and natural resources.

== History ==
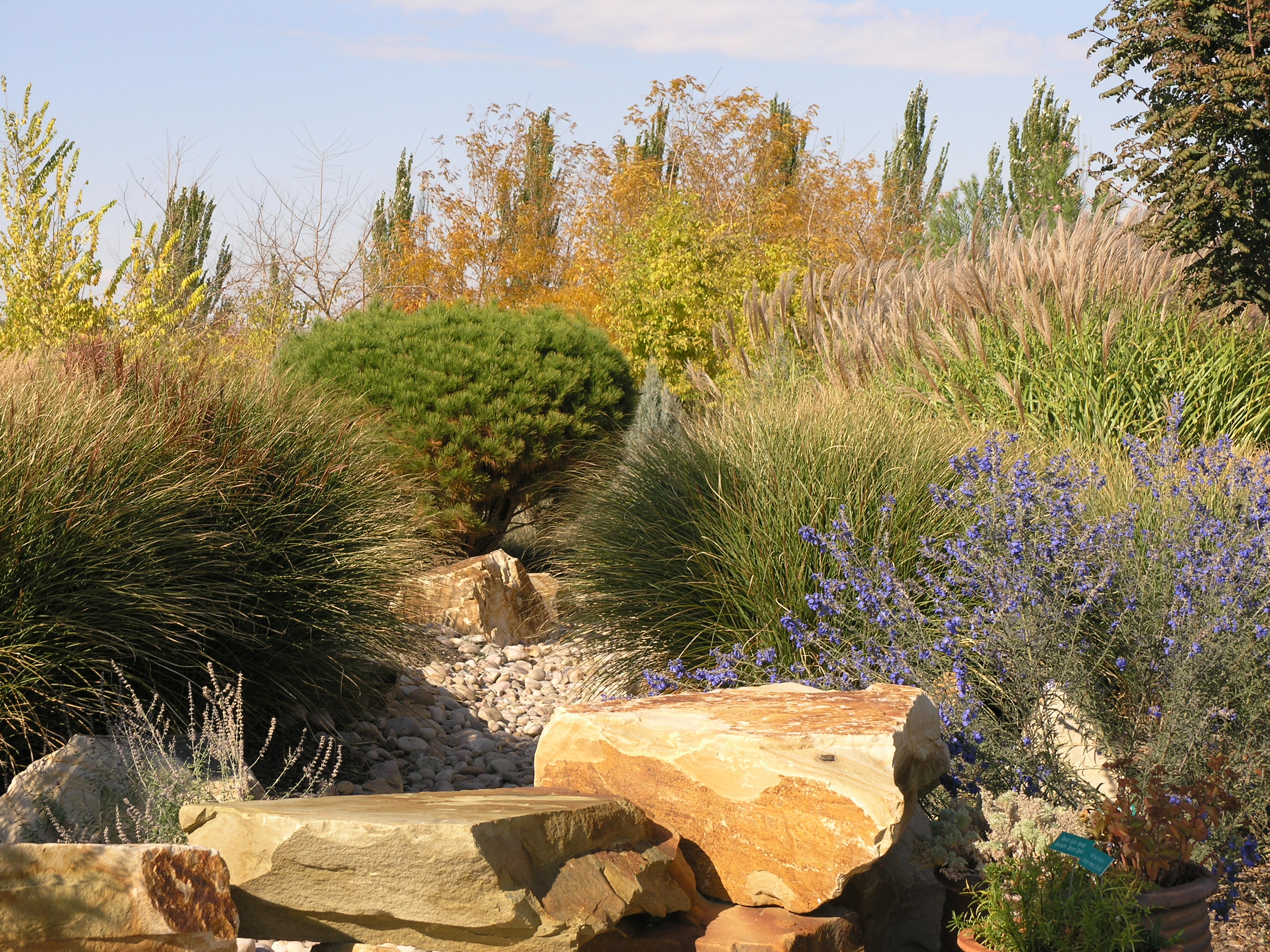
Layers of waterwise plants can create lush landscapes

A stated objective of the Central Utah Project Completion Act of 1992 was to ensure "prudent and efficient use of currently available water prior to importation of Bear River water into Salt Lake County". The Act provided substantial funding for the planning and implementation of water conservation measures. As a large stakeholder in CUP projects, Jordan Valley Water Conservancy District qualified for funding and, along with a number of other measures, began planning a waterwise demonstration garden. The original Demonstration Garden consisted of approximately two acres and opened to the public in 2001. A minor expansion was completed in 2003 which brought the total to 2.5 acres. That same year, a master plan was created that would ultimately expand the gardens to cover ten acres and include a public education center.

In 2006 the Jordan Valley Conservation Gardens Foundation was formed with the goal of completing the remaining portions of the master plan. With assistance from the Foundation and its Advisory Council, an additional 2.4 acres of educational exhibits was completed in May 2009. In Summer of 2010, a groundbreaking was held for the Education Center and construction was completed in summer 2011.

== Sustainable landscaping ==
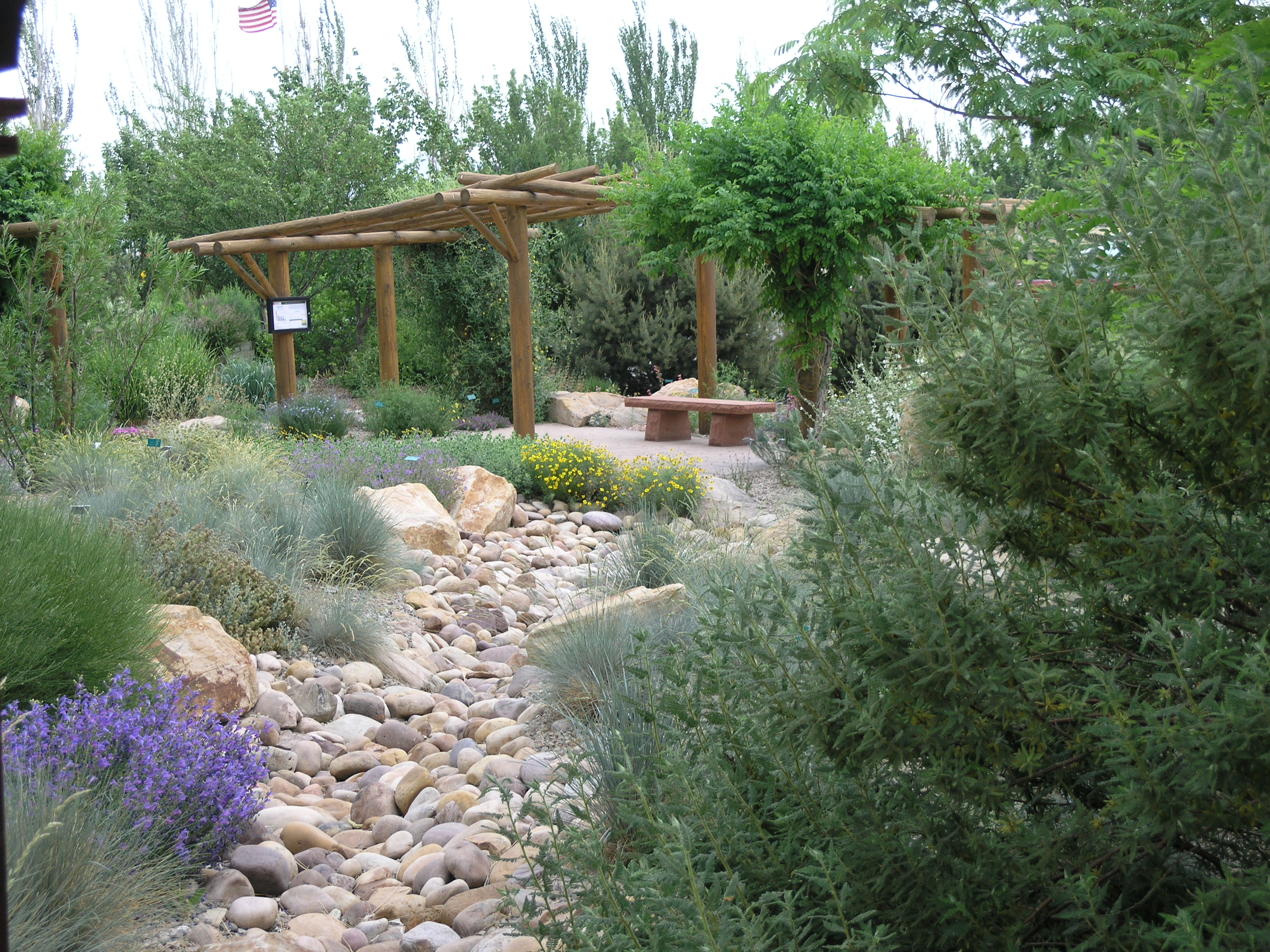
High Mountain Desert Garden

The purpose of the Conservation Garden Park is to promote sustainable landscape practices in Utah consistent with the goals of the State as outlined in the Water Conservancy District Act. Utah is the second-driest state in the United States. It is also the fastest growing state in terms of population. At some point, water usage requirements of the growing population will be unsupportable with current and planned new sources.

Adding to the concern is the fact that, generally, Utahns use more water per capita than residents of other states with the exception of Nevada. There are a limited number of potential new sources of water which can be tapped but doing so will be expensive both financially and environmentally. As 65 percent of potable water in Utah is used for watering landscapes; through the reduction of the amount of water required for landscapes, there is a great potential for water to be conserved. This reduction in landscape water use is consistent with the goal of the State of Utah and Jordan Valley Water Conservancy District to reduce per capita water consumption 25 percent.

== Educational events and resources ==
Conservation Garden Park teaches homeowners, landscape professionals, and students how to conserve water in the landscape through efficient irrigation, use of waterwise plant materials, and water-efficient maintenance. A host of free classes, public events, tours and garden fairs take place within the gardens each season. Free online resources include a Utah-specific waterwise plant database and a blog addressing common issues, items of interest, and techniques for successful landscape projects. Access to both the gardens and new Education Center is open to the public, free of charge.

== See also ==
- List of botanical gardens in the United States
- Jordan Valley Water Conservancy District
- Central Utah Project Completion Act
