= Red Butte Creek (Salt Lake County, Utah) =

Natural watercourse in Salt Lake County, Utah, United States

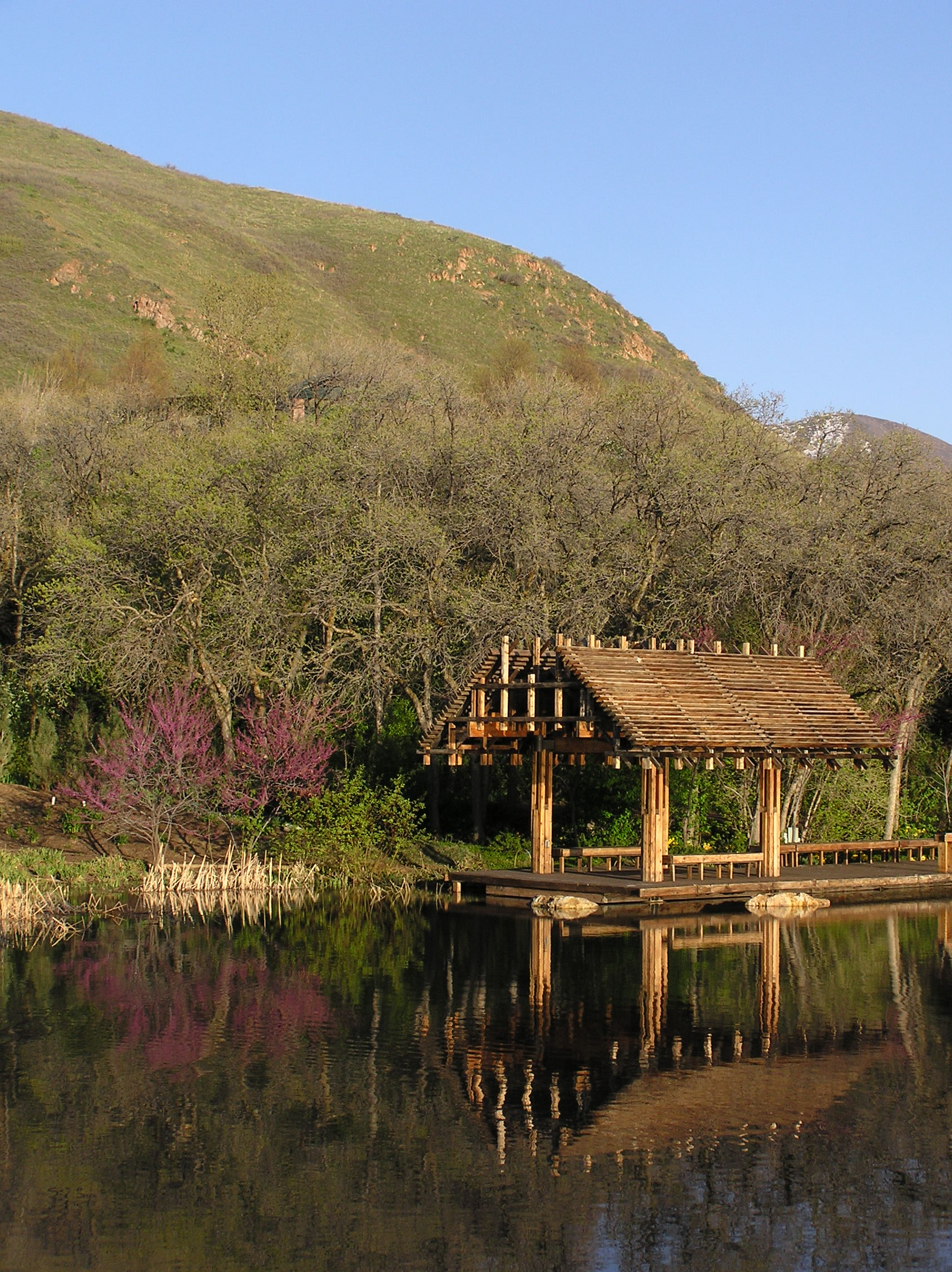
- Red Butte Creek feeds several water features in Red Butte Garden, April 2006

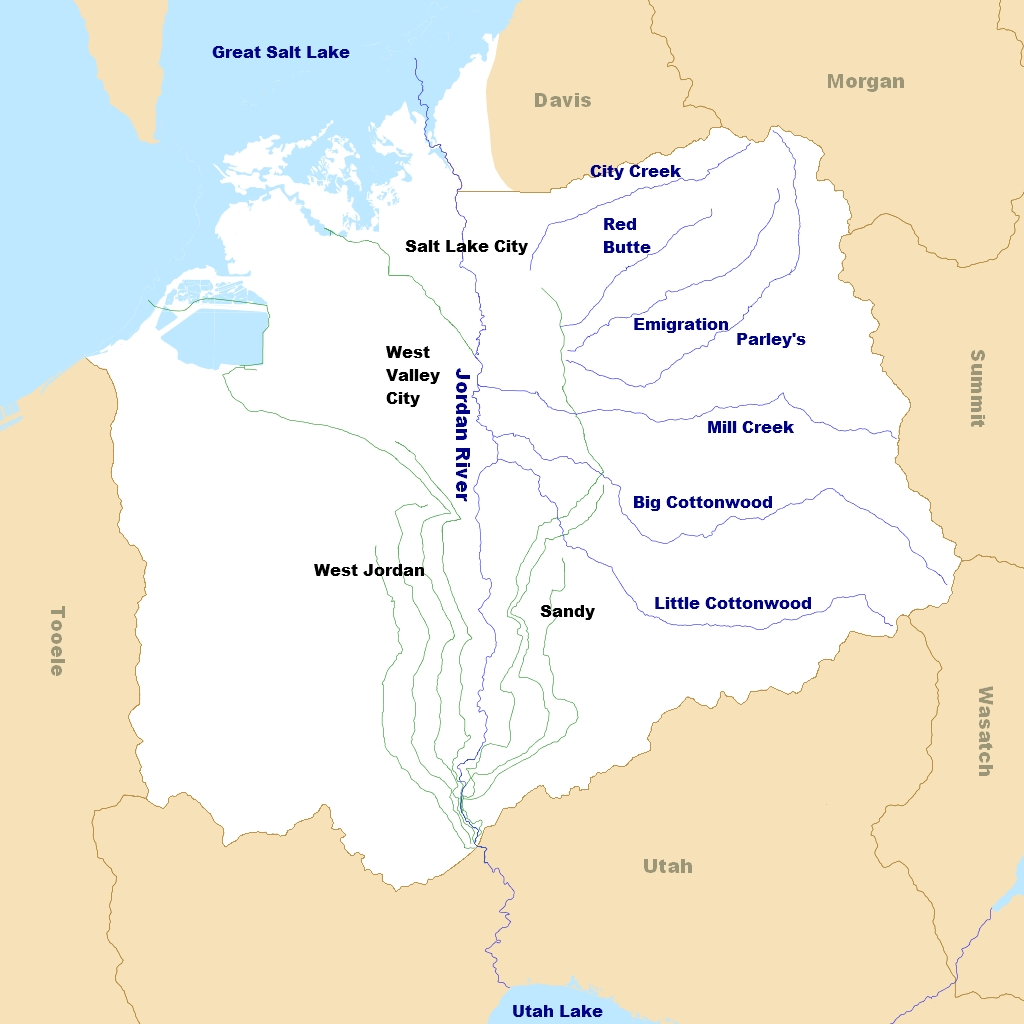
- Little Cottonwood Creek and other Salt Lake County streams

Location
- Country: United States
- State: Utah
- County: Salt Lake County

Physical characteristics
- Source
  - location: Red Butte Canyon, Utah, Salt Lake County, Utah
  - coordinates: 40°48′51″N 111°44′51″W
  - elevation: 8,000 ft (2,400 m)
- Mouth: Jordan River
  - location: Salt Lake City
  - coordinates: 40°44′42″N 111°51′26″W
  - elevation: 4,400 ft (1,300 m)
- Length: 15.3 mi (24.6 km)
- Basin size: 7.25 sq mi (18.8 km^{2})
- Discharge
  - location: Salt Lake City
  - average: 4.7 cu ft/s (0.13 m^{3}/s)
  - minimum: 2 cu ft/s (0.057 m^{3}/s)
  - maximum: 14.7 cu ft/s (0.42 m^{3}/s)

Red Butte Creek is a small stream whose headwaters are found in the northeast part of Salt Lake County, Utah, United States. It flows west through the Red Butte Garden and Arboretum, by the University of Utah, Fort Douglas and flows southwesterly to Salt Lake City’s Liberty Park. With 7.25 mi^{2} (18.8 km^{2}) of watershed, Red Butte Canyon is the smallest canyon of the seven canyons in eastern Salt Lake County. Its elevation ranges from 5,000 to 8,000 ft (1,500 to 2,400 m) above sea level.

== History ==
During the early 1850s, Red Butte Canyon was considered a source of red sandstone to construct the LDS Salt Lake Temple. A wooden railroad was considered to transport the sandstone to the temple site, but the idea was abandoned in 1855 when it was decided to construct the Temple with granite located in Little Cottonwood Canyon. A marker in Miller Park, along the creek in the city's Yalecrest neighborhood, records that during an 1868 grasshopper infestation, local residents drove the insects into the creek with sacks and willow branches so that the current carried them to sieves, where they were trapped and destroyed. The marker was placed in 1998 by the Utah State Society of the Daughters of the American Revolution.

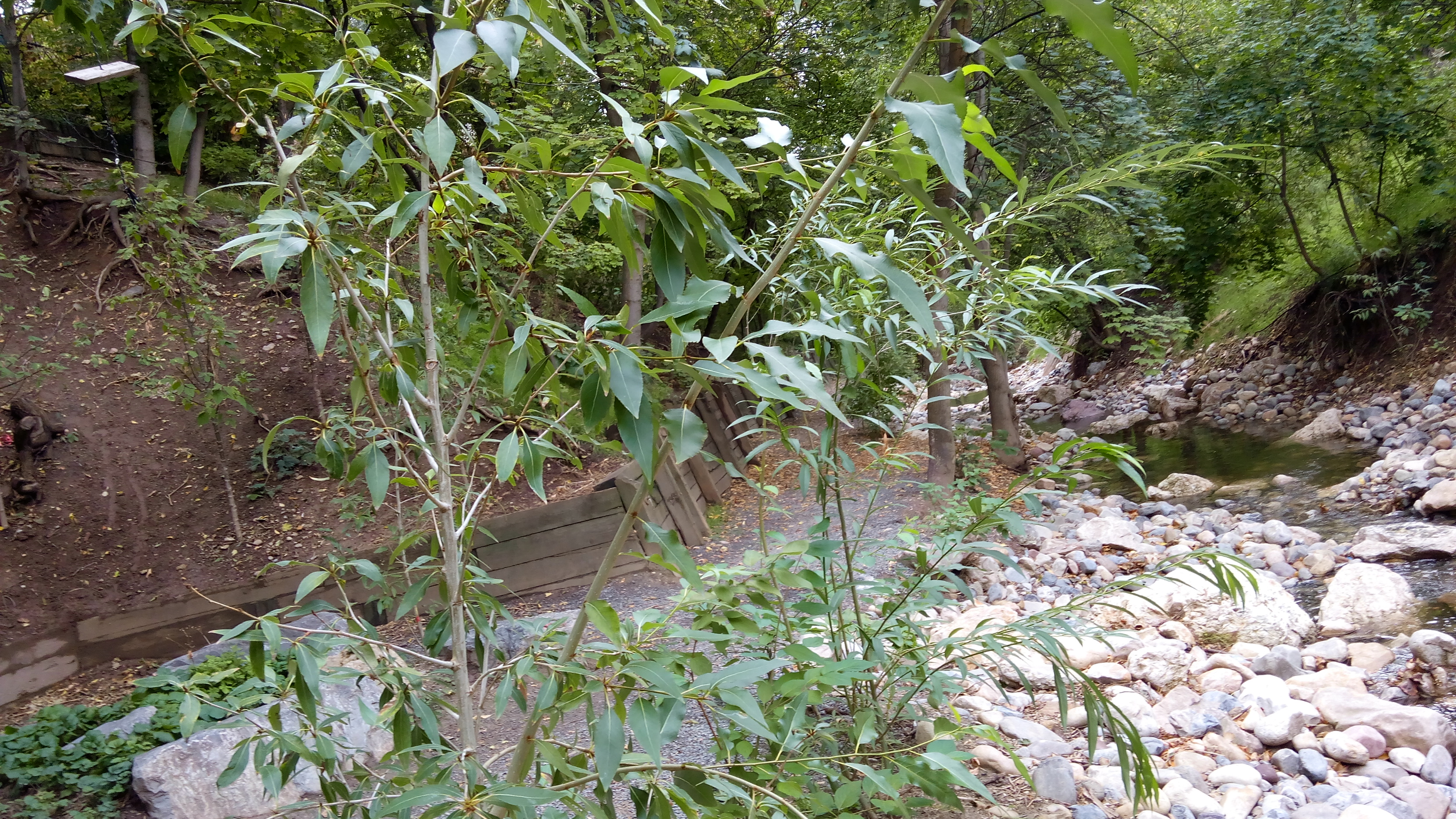
Young Narrowleaf Cottonwood tree used to restore Red Butte Creek's banks in Salt Lake City, October 2015

The first major use of Red Butte Creek water was by the United States Army at Fort Douglas, which was established at the mouth of the canyon in 1862. This utilization of water outside the canyon had little effect on the canyon itself, as U.S. Army administrators worked over many years to protect the watershed and water quality. Protection has grown steadily since Fort Douglas was first established and particularly since the canyon was acquired by the U.S. Forest Service in 1969 and declared to be a Research Natural Area.

Red Butte Creek was used for irrigation by a few pioneers east of Salt Lake City in the early 1850s. When Fort Douglas was established in 1862, Army personnel initially depended mostly on water from nearby springs. However, by 1875 Army personnel constructed two reservoirs east of Fort Douglas and diverted water from Red Butte Creek to fill them. In response to the recurrent stream pollution problems caused by quarrying activities, the Territory District Court, in 1890, declared that the waters of Red Butte Creek were the sole property of the U.S. Army and under the jurisdiction of Fort Douglas. Also, in 1890, the U.S. Congress passed a law to protect the water supply of Fort Douglas. This law prevented any sale of land in the canyon or further watershed development. In 1906 the Army built a dam on Red Butte Creek to supply additional water for Fort Douglas. The dam was constructed between 1928 and 1930, and the reservoir provided water for Fort Douglas until its closure in 1991.

Red Butte Creek is a perennial third-order stream without upstream regulation or diversion until the flow is collected in the reservoir located near the base of the canyon. The stream has created a narrow-based canyon with sides rising abruptly at an average slope of about 35 degrees to the north and about 40 degrees to the south.

== Hydrology ==
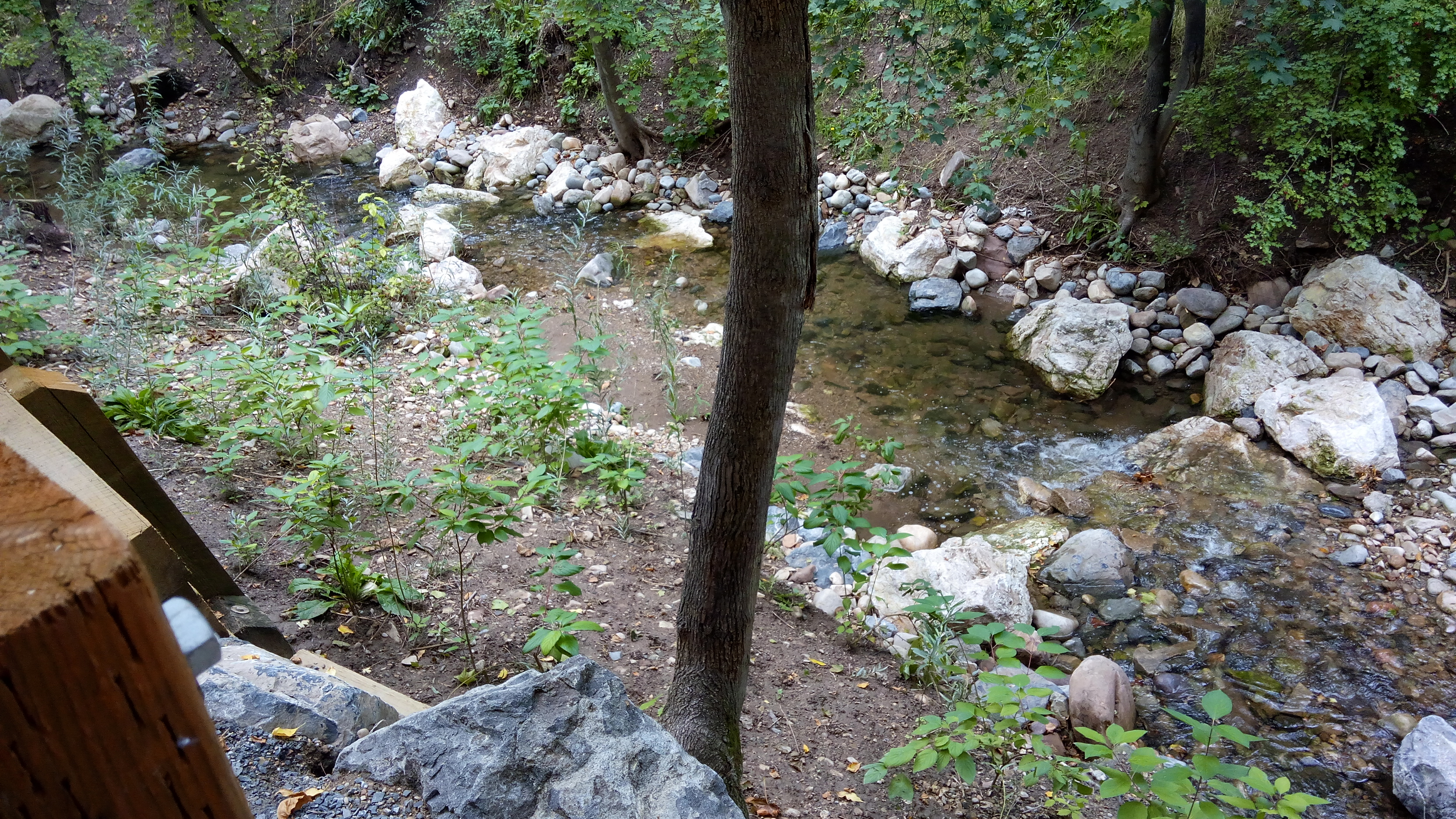
Red Butte Creek after restoration on October 5, 2015

The average monthly discharge from 1964 to 1988 was 4.7 cu ft/s (0.133 m^{3}/s) per second as it enters the reservoir at 1,646 m (5,400 ft) elevation. The stream flow exhibits a straightforward annual pattern; characteristic of this geographic region-high, spring flows are driven by snowmelt followed by very much reduced flows derived from groundwater throughout the remainder of the year. Spring melt flow, typically an order of magnitude greater than other periods of the year, peaks in May and persists for six to eight weeks. The average monthly stream flow rate during May is 14.7 cu ft/s (0.416 m^{3}/s) per second. By September, the lowest average monthly flow rate, stream discharge has decreased to 2.0 cu ft/s (0.058 m^{3}/s) per second. Mean stream flow rates do not increase during the summer, although nearly one-fourth of the annual precipitation falls. Average monthly stream flow values, however, hide much of the stream dynamics and the resultant impact on riparian vegetation. Daily, stream flows can vary tremendously during snowmelt, depending on air temperatures and snowpack depth, primarily upper Red Butte Canyon and Knowltons Fork.

The 1982–83 winter was one of unusually high precipitation along the Wasatch Front. Heavy snows in mid-May 1983 were followed by equally unusual warm temperatures at the end of the month. As a consequence, stream flow rates peaked at record values; on 28 May 1983, Red Butte Creek crested at a discharge rate exceeding 105 cu ft/s (2.97 m^{3}/s) per second (stream flow was above the maximum gage height). The overland flow was substantial, This was by far the greatest discharge rate in recent times, having eclipsed the previous maximum single day rate of 60 cu ft/s (1.70 m^{3}/s) per second measured on 18 May 1975.

== Ecosystem ==
The canyon is managed by the U.S. Forest Service as a protected reserve and is gated to prevent public access. This makes this watershed the most pristine area along the Wasatch Front. The Utah Field Office of the U.S. Fish and Wildlife Service reported that 400 endangered June sucker fish were planted in the reservoir, and they are thriving in 1994.

=== Chevron pipeline oil spill ===
On the morning of June 12, 2010, nearly 33,000 gallons of petroleum spilled into Red Butte Creek. A ruptured pipeline owned by Chevron Corporation burst on the creek outside Red Butte Garden and Arboretum. The spill was stopped by the afternoon, but not before the petroleum reached the Jordan River. Affected wildlife were transported to Hogle Zoo for treatment.

== See also ==
- List of rivers of Utah
