= Red Butte Garden and Arboretum =

Botanical garden and amphitheater in Salt Lake City, Utah, USA

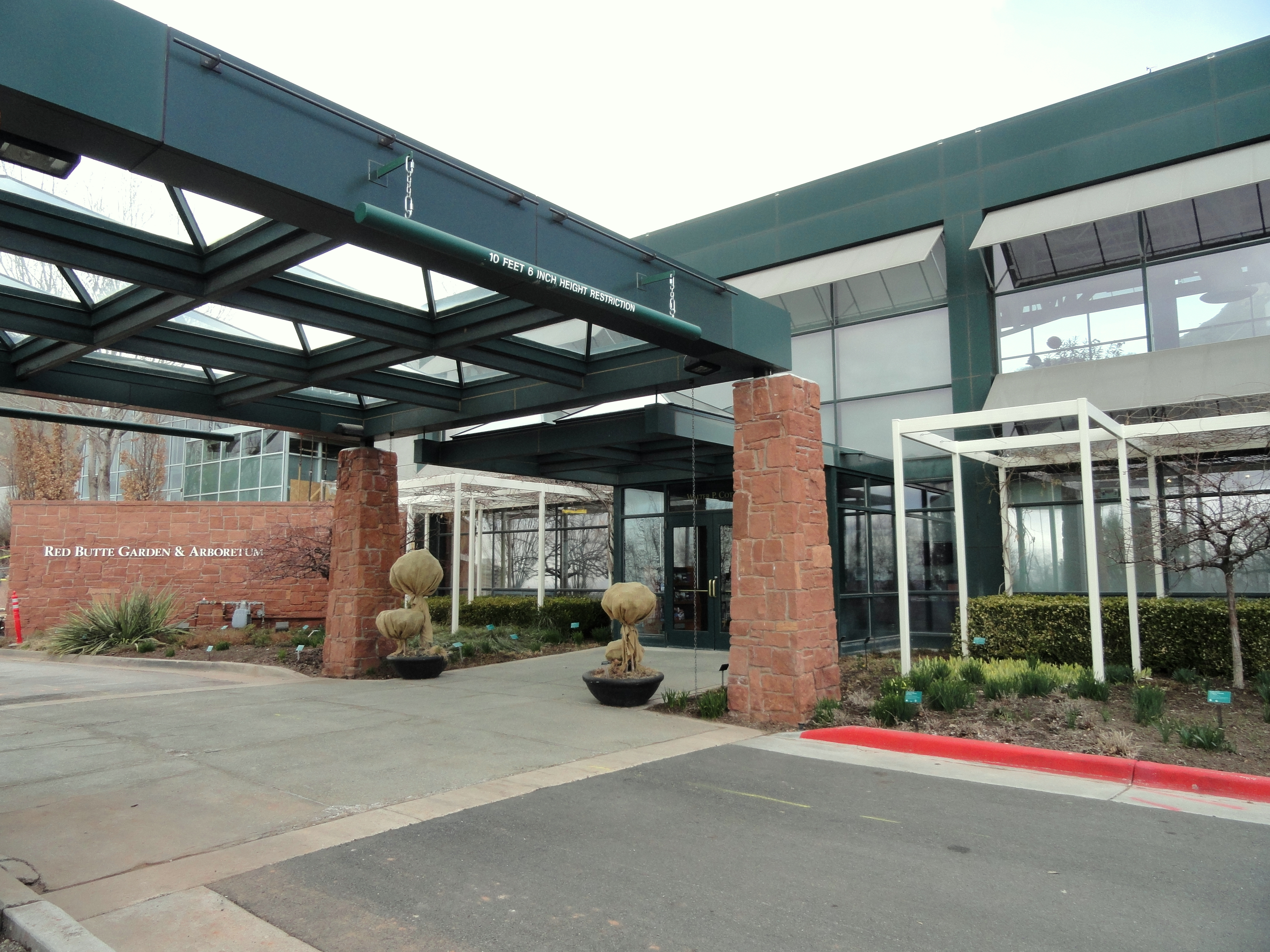
- Entrance to the garden and arboretum.

- Location within Utah Location within the United States
- Location: University of Utah; Salt Lake City, Utah; United States
- Coordinates: 40.766°N 111.824°W
- Area: 21 acres (8.5 ha)
- Etymology: Red Butte Creek
- Website: redbuttegarden.org

Red Butte Garden and Arboretum consists of a botanical garden, arboretum, and amphitheatre operated by the University of Utah, in the foothills of the Wasatch Range in Salt Lake City, Utah, United States. It is open year-round to the public. Red Butte Garden contains over 100 acres (0.40 km^{2}) of botanical gardens and several miles of hiking trails through native vegetation. Red Butte Creek runs within the northern part of the garden.

== History ==
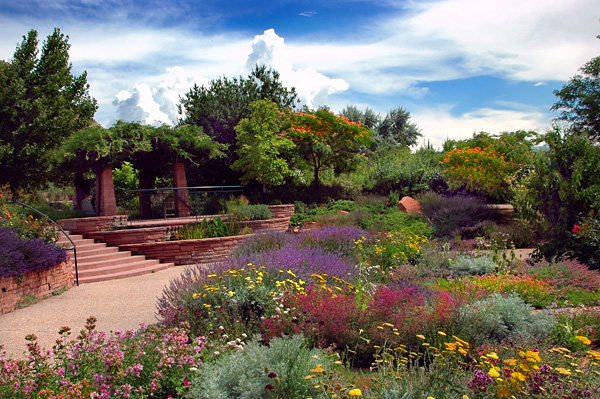
One section of the garden.

In 1930, Dr. Walter P. Cottam, co-founder of the Nature Conservancy and chairman of the Botany Department at the University of Utah, began using campus land for plant research. For more than 30 years, he evaluated plants to determine their adaptability to their region.

In 1961, the Utah State Legislature formally recognized Cottam's impressive collection by designating the university's campus landscape as the State Arboretum. The original legislation mandated that the arboretum "provide resources and facilities for cultivating a greater knowledge and public appreciation for the trees and plants around us, as well as those growing in remote sections of the country and world."

With the growth of the arboretum, the University of Utah hired Richard Hildreth as a full-time director to initiate meaningful interpretation of the collections and to develop educational programs emphasizing practical horticulture and plant identification.

As the university grew, so did the arboretum's need for permanent public educational facilities and display gardens. In 1983, Ezekiel R. Dumke. Jr. and Richard Hildreth led the efforts to have the university dedicate 150 acres at the mouth of Red Butte Canyon for a regional botanical garden. The organization's name was changed from the State Arboretum to Red Butte Garden & Arboretum. The site provided an outstanding opportunity to showcase horticultural collections and to interpret the richly diverse natural area. This opportunity inspired the expansion of the garden's mission to include not only horticulture but also conservation and environmental education.

The garden formally opened to the public in 1985. In 1994, the Walter P. Cottam Visitor Center (funded by the George S. and Dolores Dore Eccles Foundation) opened. Over the years other additions have been the Courtyard Garden, Fragrance Garden, Medicinal Garden, Herb Garden, Hemingway Four Seasons Garden, Dumke Floral Walk, Children's Garden, the Richard K. Hemingway Orangerie, an amphitheater, expanded gift shop, and the McCarthy Family Rose Garden. All were funded by community donations.

== Attractions ==
Red Butte Garden has 21 acres of display gardens and over 5 miles of hiking trails. The garden has 200,000 annual visitors, over 10,000 garden members, and over 300 active volunteers.

== Gallery ==
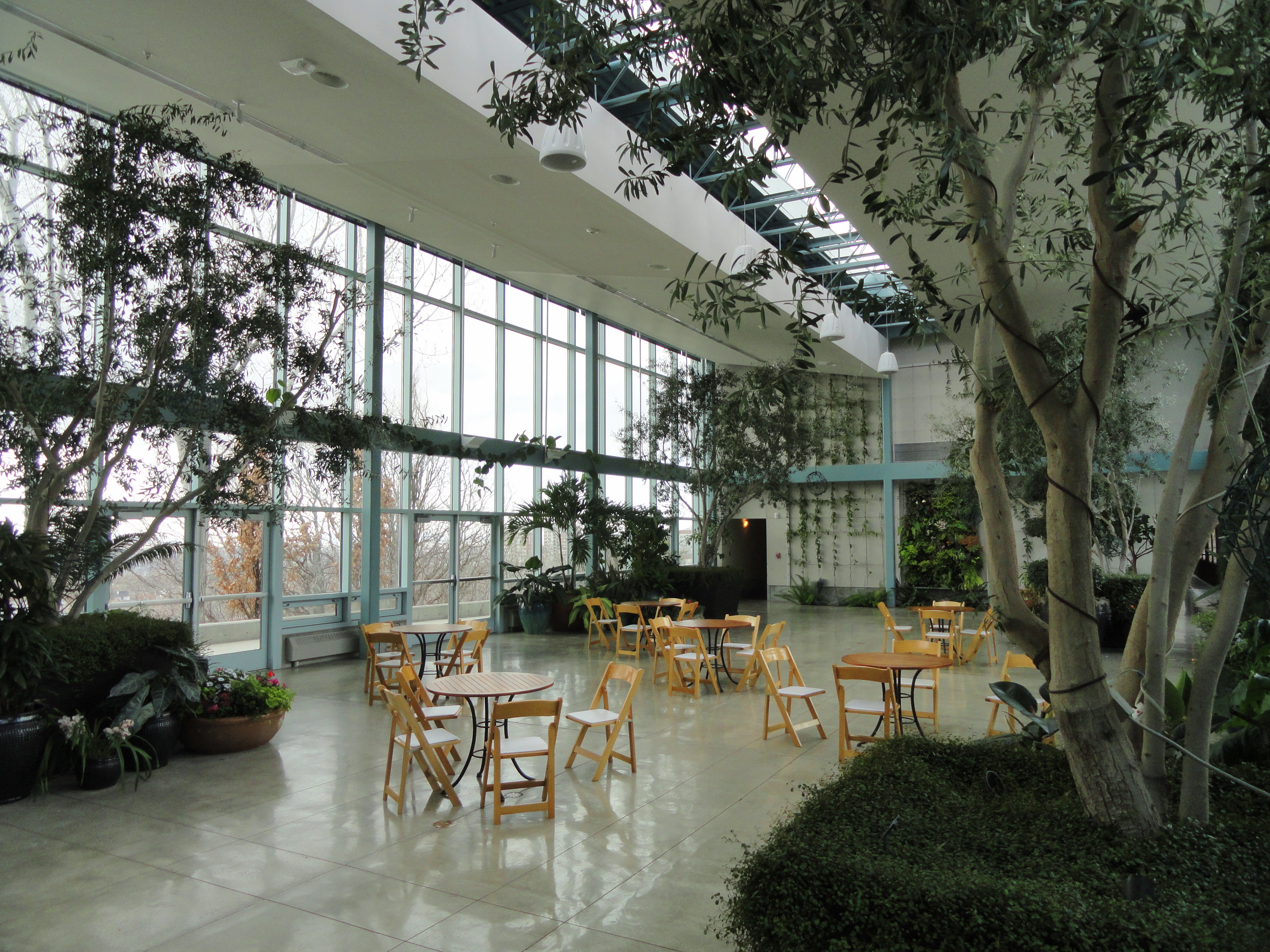
Orangery

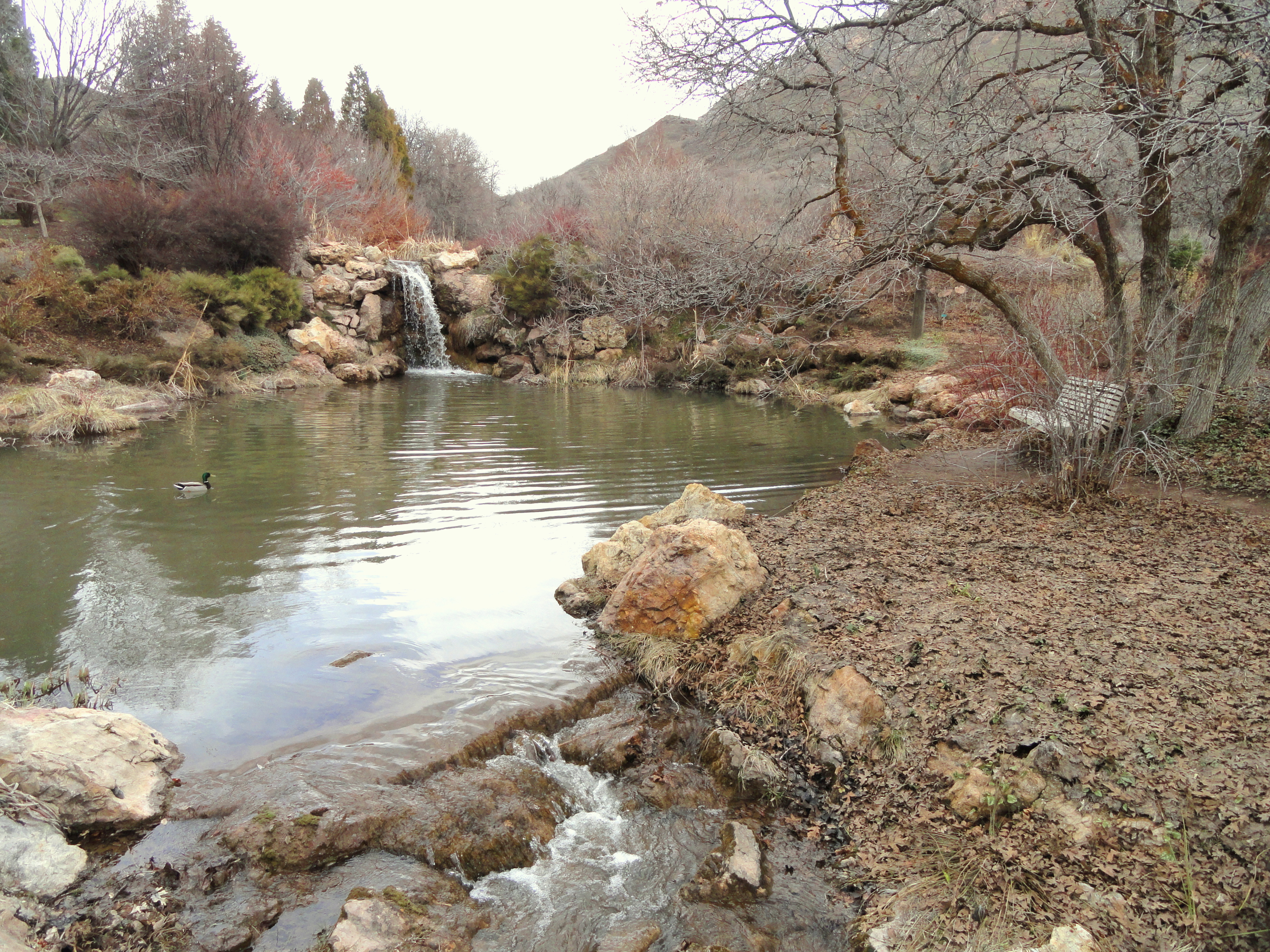
Red Butte Creek runs through the garden.

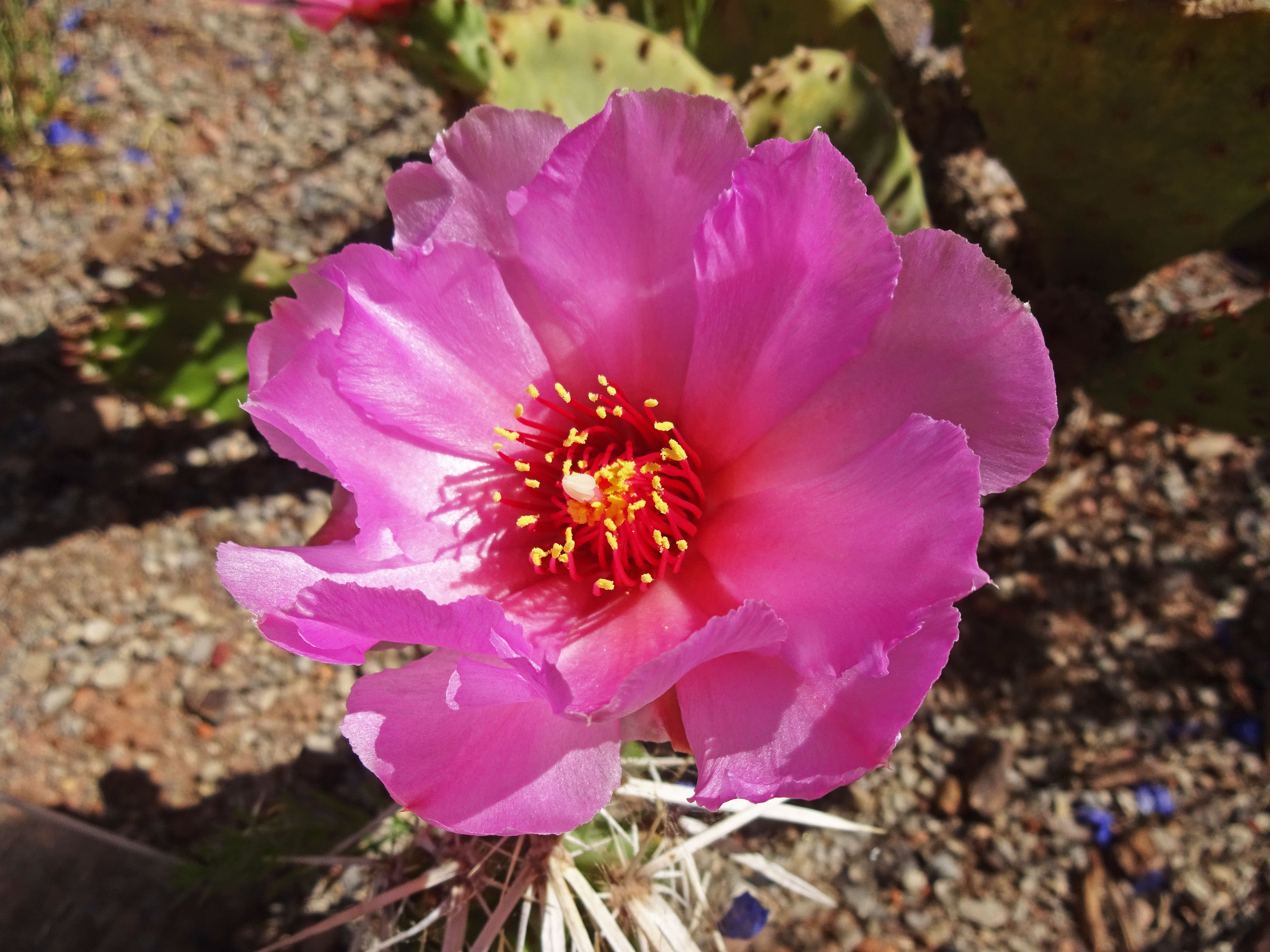
Beavertail cactus (Opuntia basilaris)

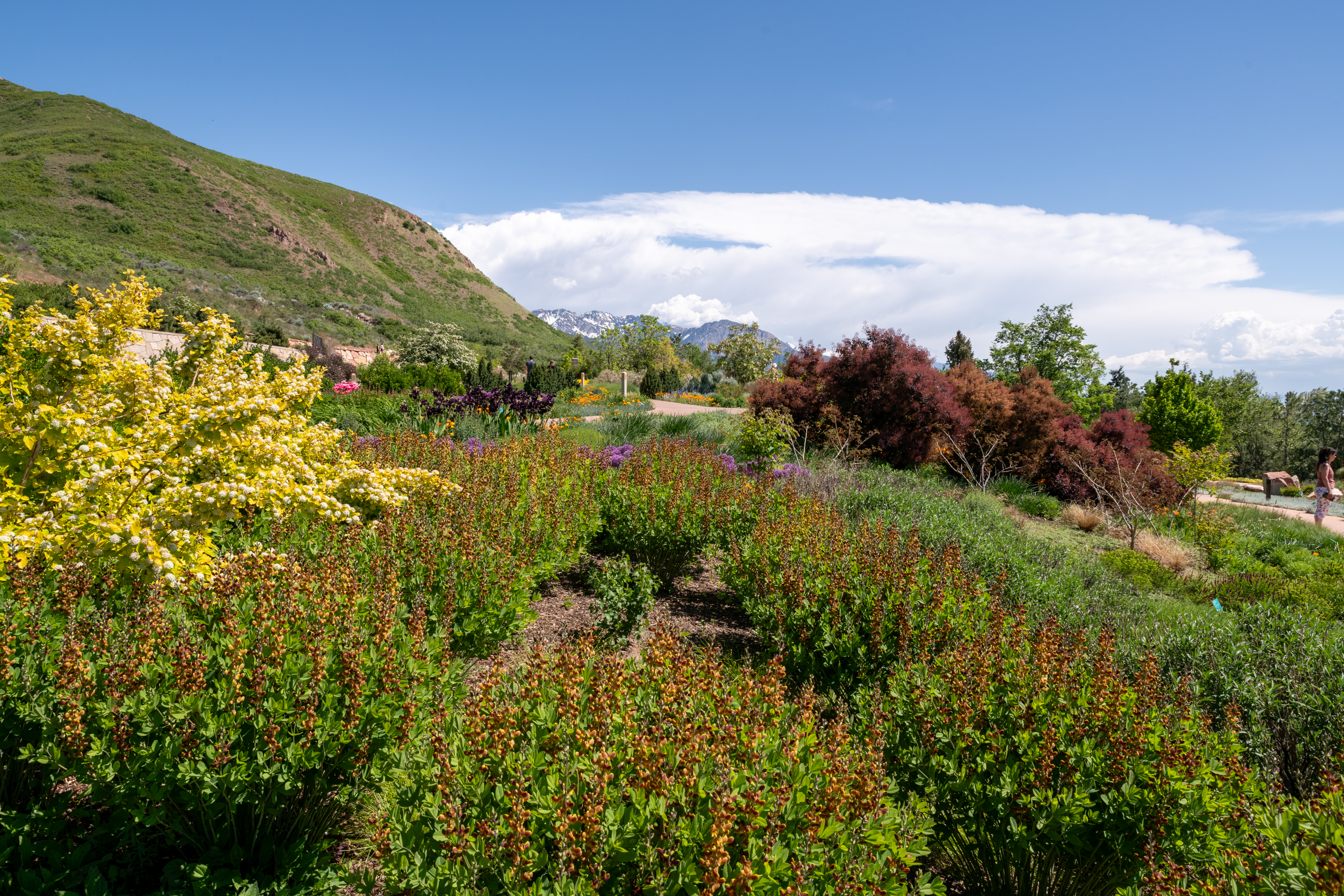
View from one of the walkways.

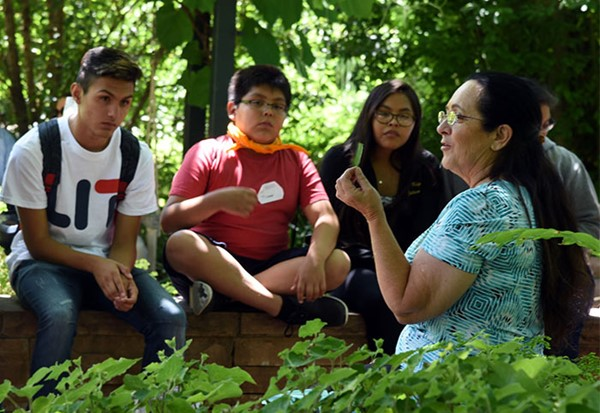
Earth Connections Camp.

== See also ==
- List of botanical gardens in the United States
- Utah Native Plant Society
- State Arboretum of Utah
