= State Arboretum of Utah =

Arboretum in Salt Lake City, Utah

Coordinates: 40.77°N 111.84°W

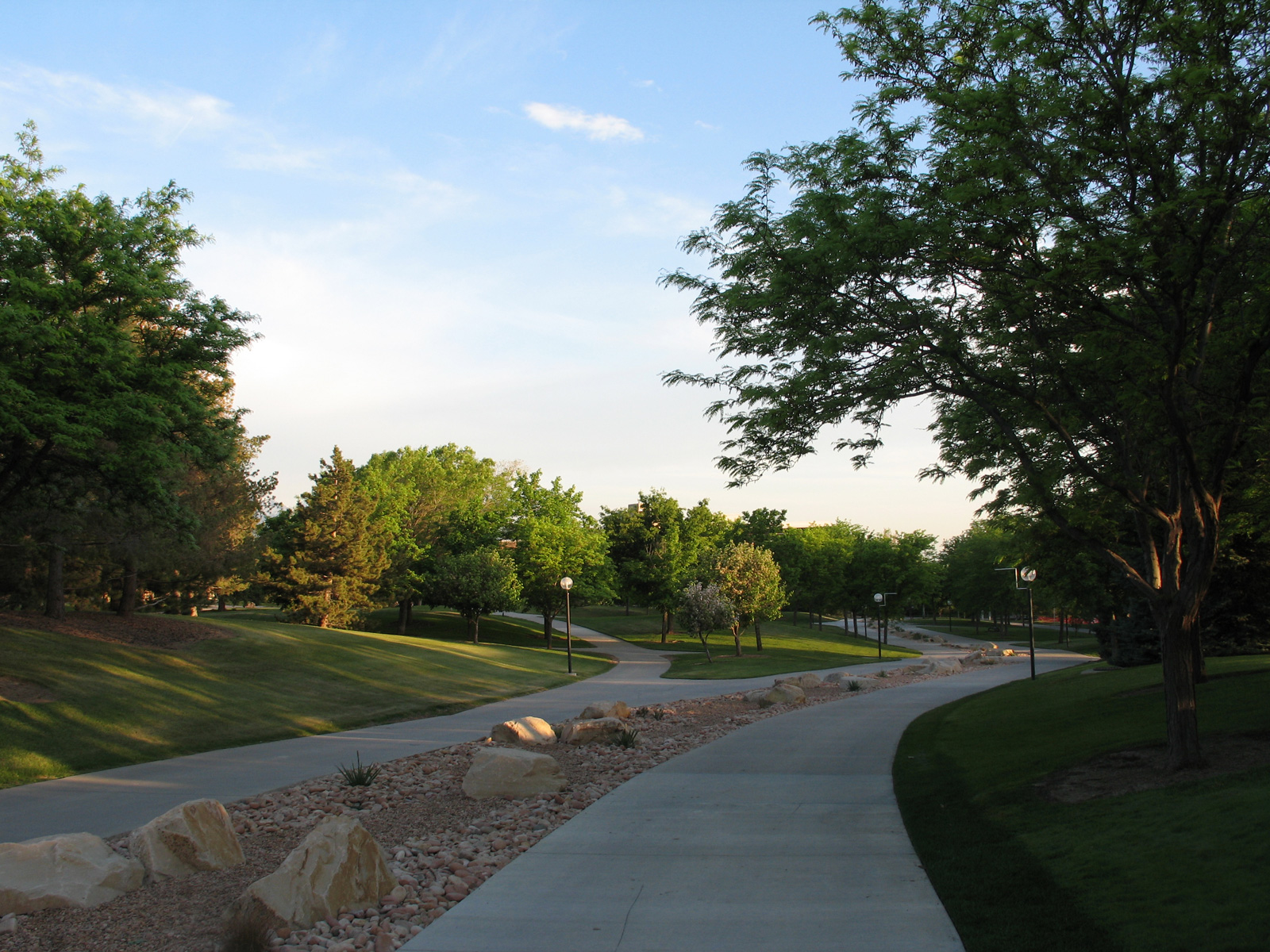
- A tree-lined walkway at the University of Utah. The majority of the state arboretum is located across the university campus with the second part of the arboretum located at Red Butte Garden and Arboretum.
- Interactive map of State Arboretum of Utah
- Type: Arboretum
- Location: Salt Lake City, Utah
- Website: www.usu.edu/facilities/arboretum

The State Arboretum of Utah (1,500 acres (6.1 km^{2})) is an arboretum located across the campus of the University of Utah in Salt Lake City, Utah, as well as on an additional site (147 acres (0.59 km^{2})) at Red Butte Garden and Arboretum. The campus grounds and the Red Butte Garden are open to the public every day. The conservatory is open by appointment only.

The State Arboretum was established in 1961. The arboretum now contains over 7,000 trees (300 species and varieties, including over 200 taxa of conifers). The arboretum's conservatory (1,100 sq ft (100 m^{2})) contains over 400 exotic taxa. Red Butte Garden and Arboretum contains more than 1,500 conifers.

== See also ==
- Red Butte Garden and Arboretum
- List of botanical gardens in the United States
- Utah Native Plant Society
