= Bertrand F. Harrison Arboretum =

Arboretum on the campus of Brigham Young University in Provo, Utah

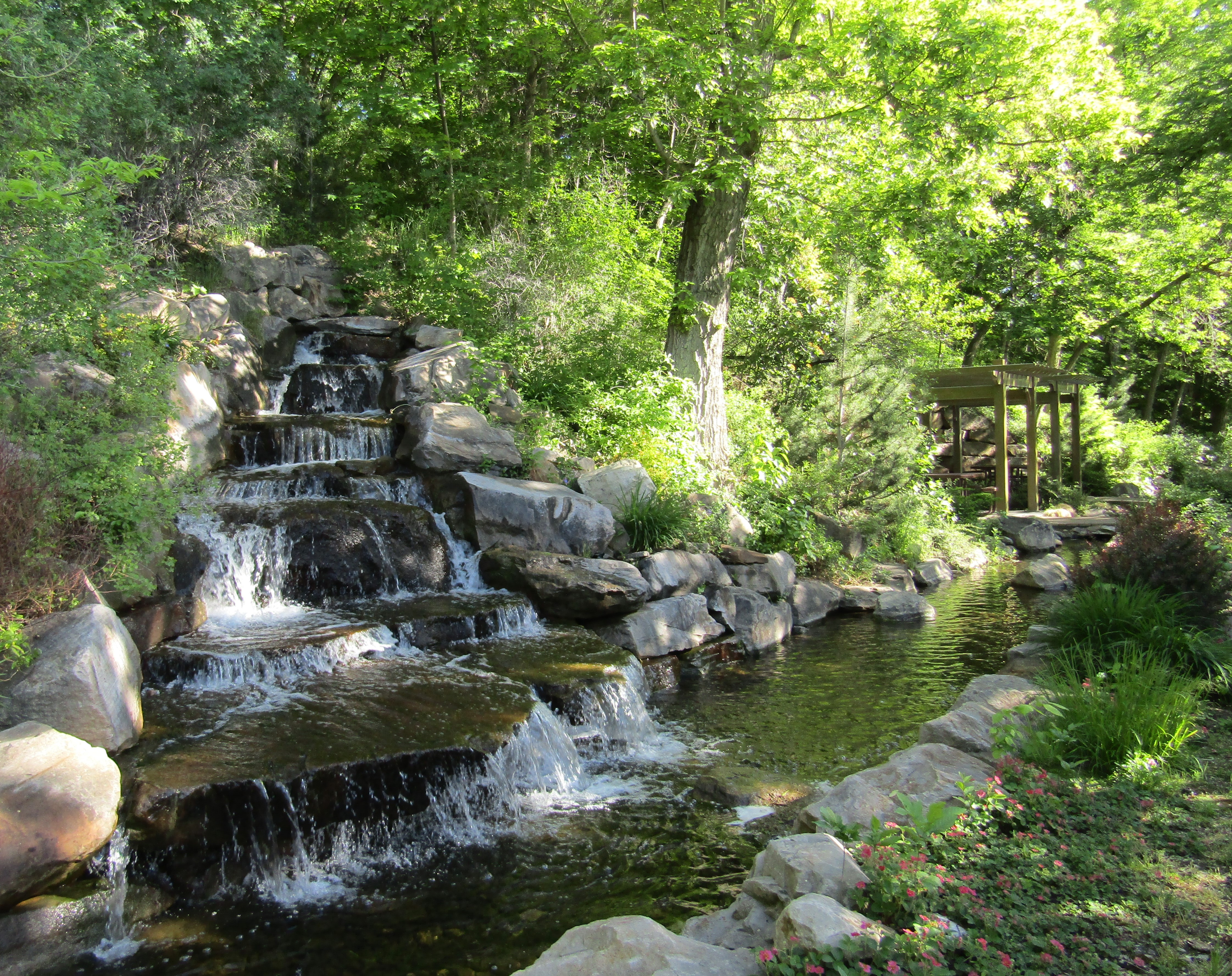
- Interactive map of Bertrand F. Harrison Arboretum
- Type: Urban park, Arboretum, Public bath
- Location: Provo, Utah
- Coordinates: 40°14′40″N 111°39′3″E
- Owner: Brigham Young University
- Status: Open all year

The Bertrand F. Harrison Arboretum, also known as the Brigham Young University Arboretum, is an arboretum located on a hill beside at 800 North Street on the campus of Brigham Young University in Provo, Utah, United States. It includes a native plants from both eastern and western regions of the United States. It also has a duck pond and a stream, as well as a brick path that winds through the garden.

The arboretum is named after Bertrand F. Harrison, a botany professor at BYU who retired in 1974. He and his team constructed the pond after finding an underground spring. Its amphitheater was donated by BYU's classes of 1980 and 1981. Trees in the arboretum were originally planted to reflect the geography of the United States.

== See also ==
- List of botanical gardens in the United States
