= Utah Native Plant Society =

Non-profit organization

- Utah Native Plant Society Inc.
- Abbreviation: UNPS
- Formation: 1978; 47 years ago
- Founder: W. Richard Hildreth
- Type: Nonprofit
- Tax ID no.: 87-0352935
- Headquarters: Salt Lake City, Utah
- Website: https://www.unps.org/

The Utah Native Plant Society (UNPS) is a non-profit organization dedicated to the appreciation, preservation, conservation and responsible use of the native plants and plant communities found in the state of Utah and the Intermountain West. Its goal is to foster public recognition of the spectacularly diverse flora of the state.

UNPS advocates the use of local, native plants in the landscape and in revegetation projects as well as for the preservation of endangered and threatened plant species and native ecosystems.

== History ==
The organization was founded in 1978. W. Richard ("Dick") Hildreth was the primary founder (then director of the State Arboretum of Utah and later the first director of Red Butte Garden and Arboretum). UNPS recognized Hildreth with a lifetime achievement award in March 2005. The first president was botanist N. Duane Atwood.

== Projects ==
Since January 1982, the Sego Lily, named for the plant Calochortus nuttallii, has been the official newsletter and primary publication of the organization. From its inception, rare plants (particularly those under consideration for listing under the Endangered Species Act of 1973 as amended) and the horticulture of native plants have been the primary areas of focus. The Sego Lily newsletter has been a reference source for various Federal Register and other publications. The Sego lily is the state flower of Utah.

Under the leadership of Susan Meyer, the society embarked on an ambitious "heritage garden program" that led to the creation of numerous native plant gardens typically in association with educational institutions in the 1990s. The organization has regularly provided grants to others related to activities associated with rare plant research and other native plant related work. One of the society's first grants was in connection with the endangered dwarf bearclaw poppy, Arctomecon humilis.

UNPS hosted annual rare plant conferences throughout the 1980s. It resumed that role in 2000, and since 2001 has co-hosted rare plant conferences with Red Butte Garden. In 2003 the society completed the initial phase of digitizing and updating the Utah Endangered, Threatened, and Sensitive Plant Field Guide (by Duane Atwood et al., 1991) which was funded in part by a Bureau of Land Management challenge grant. This led to the publication of the Utah Rare Plant Guide.
