= Washington County Water Conservancy District =

Water district in Utah

The Washington County Water Conservancy District (WCWCD) is a water district covering Washington County, Utah. It was formed in 1962 by local petition. The district provides wholesale water to the cities of St. George, Washington, Hurricane, Santa Clara, Ivins, Toquerville, La Verkin, Leeds, and (when needed) the town of Virgin. The cities are required to engage in water conservation and recycling, and the district is required to develop water sources to meet the needs determined by city governments. The district also supplies drinking water to retail customers in the unincorporated areas of Sky Ranch, Cliffdweller Ranch, Casa de Oro, and (seasonally) Kolob.

== Facilities ==
WCWCD assumed ownership of the Quail Creek Water Treatment Plant from the city of St. George in 2006. The plant was first operational in 1989 and has since been expanded several times. It draws water from the Sand Hollow and Quail Creek reservoirs and the Virgin River.

As of 2021, the district operates about 34 wells in six clusters, with two more clusters proposed, along with proposed expansion at Sand Hollow Wells and Cottham Wells. The largest cluster accesses the underground aquifer near the Sand Hollow Reservoir. Water can be transferred between municipal systems if necessary.

| Storage facility | Completed | Size | Notes |
|---|---|---|---|
| Sand Hollow Reservoir | 2002 | 51,360 acre-feet (63,350,000 m^{3}) | Stores water piped in from the Virgin River, recharges 300,000 acre-feet (370,000,000 m^{3}) underground aquifer, feeds Quail Creek Water Treatment Plant for potable water. |
| Quail Creek Reservoir | 1984 | 40,325 acre-feet (49,740,000 m^{3}) | Stores water piped in from the Virgin River, feeds Quail Creek Water Treatment Plant for potable water |
| Gunlock Reservoir | 1970 | 10,884 acre-feet (13,425,000 m^{3}) | Dams the Santa Clara River, secondary water (irrigation) |
| Kolob Reservoir | 1956 | 5,586 acre-feet (6,890,000 m^{3}) | |
| Ivins Reservoir | 1918 | 778 acre-feet (960,000 m^{3}) | Secondary water (irrigation) |
| Toquer Reservoir | Planned | 3,640 acre-feet (4,490,000 m^{3}) | Part of the Ash Creek Project |
| Warner Valley Reservoir | Proposed | | |

| Hydropower facility | Completed | Size | Notes |
|---|---|---|---|
| Hurricane Hydro | 1987 | 600 kW | Supplies electricity to Hurricane City, operates on water returning to lower Virgin River for downstream water rights |
| Quail Creek Hydro | 1985 | 2.4 MW | Supplies electricity to Dixie Power, operates on water diverted from upper Virgin River |

WCWCD manages wastewater treatment for the western part of unincorporated Washington County (west of Interstate 15 and Kolob), including the Dammeron Valley Wastewater System. Wastewater in the eastern portion of the county is managed by the Ash Creek Special Service District.

WCWCD owns several secondary water pipelines used for irrigation and converted from older open canal systems. These include the Gunlock to Santa Clara pipeline, the St. George and Washington Canal System, and the Toquerville Secondary Water System which was purchased from the Toquerville Irrigation Company in 1998.

The district became sole owner of the La Verkin Hot Springs (also known as Dixie Hot Springs, Pah Tempe, or La Verkin Sulphur Springs) in 2013. It closed access to the public, and as of 2021 is considering options for recreation and water quality rectification. The springs dump high-salinity water into the Virgin River which make its lower stretches unsuitable as a water supply.

== Lake Powell Pipeline ==
The district has proposed construction of the Lake Powell Pipeline, that would add the Colorado River (via Lake Powell) as a source of drinking water outside the Virgin River watershed. The advocacy groups Western Resource Advocates, Utah Rivers Council, and Conserve Southwest Utah say the county should avoid the cost and environmental impact of the pipeline by making more efficient use of its existing water supply. As of 2021, the pipeline is under environmental review, and depending on the final plan is estimated to cost between $1.1 and $1.9 billion in 2020 dollars. The state Lake Powell Pipeline Development Act of 2006 envisions the possible participation of the Kane Water Conservancy District and the Central Iron County Water Conservancy District; the law says the project would be built by the state through the Utah Board of Water Resources, and the cost repaid by participating districts.
