= Jordan Valley Water Conservancy District =

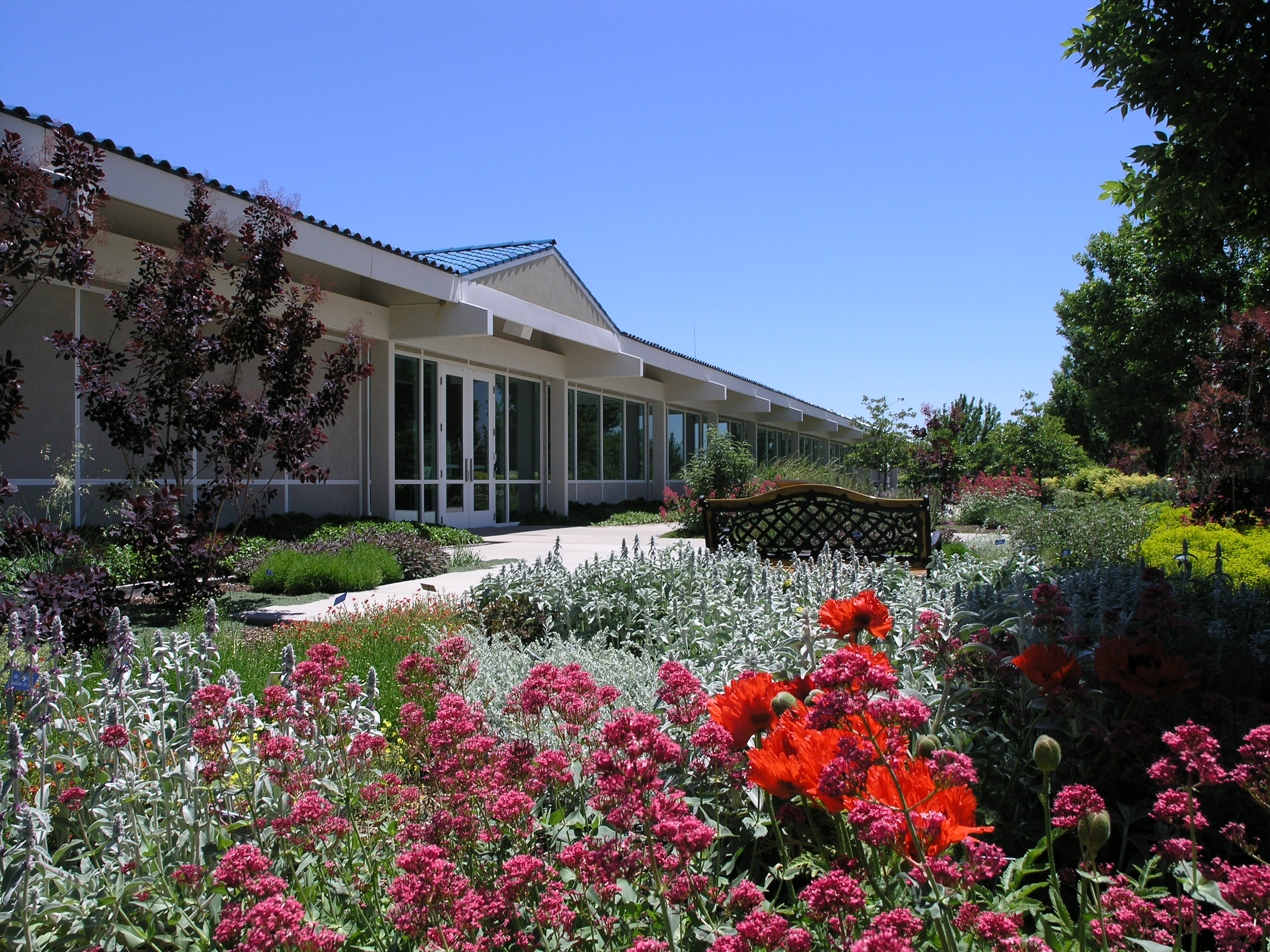
Waterwise gardens surround the Administrative Office at Headquarters site

Primarily a wholesaler of water to cities and improvement districts within Salt Lake County, Jordan Valley Water Conservancy District is a political subdivision of the State of Utah and one of the largest water districts in the state. It was created in 1951 under the Water Conservancy District Act and was called Salt Lake County Water Conservancy District until 1999. Jordan Valley Water is the largest petitioner of the Central Utah Project, a Federal water project which will annually provide up to 71,400 acre-feet (88,100,000 m^{3}) of water to Jordan Valley Water by 2021.

Jordan Valley Water is governed by a board of nine Trustees who represent eight geographical divisions. They are nominated either by the Salt Lake County Council or a city council, depending upon the division they represent. The Governor then appoints Trustees for a four-year term from those nominated.

Jordan Valley Water has a retail service area primarily in unincorporated areas of Salt Lake County, making up about ten percent of its deliveries. Approximately ninety percent of its municipal water is delivered on a wholesale basis to cities and water districts. In addition, Jordan Valley Water treats and delivers water to Metropolitan Water District of Salt Lake & Sandy on a contractual basis for delivery to Salt Lake City and Sandy City, even though neither city is within Jordan Valley Water's service boundaries. Jordan Valley Water also delivers untreated water to irrigators in Salt Lake and Utah Counties to meet commitments under irrigation exchanges.

== Water conservation issues ==
Jordan Valley Water Conservancy District is responsible to plan for long-term facilities and monitor water use to ensure that a sustainable supply of water will be available for the 600,000+ residents within its service area. Given that Utah is the second-driest State in the nation, this presents some unique challenges. Generally, Utahns use more water per capita than residents of other states, with the exception of Nevada. There are a limited number of potential new sources of water which can be developed; however, doing so will be expensive both financially and environmentally. With a goal of reducing water use 25 percent by 2025, Jordan Valley Water launched a major conservation campaign in 1999 in the hopes of extending water supplies for future generations without having to pursue as many new sources.

With approximately 65 percent of culinary water used on outdoor landscaping, it was decided that outdoor water would be the place to begin: educate the public about more efficient ways to water their landscapes, and to teach them that water-efficient landscaping can be beautiful.

In 1999, Jordan Valley Water developed the conservation education campaign "Slow The Flow, Save H2O" as a major component of its water conservation efforts. The campaign was successful, spread statewide, and has been adopted by every major water district in Utah.

In 2000, Jordan Valley Water began developing waterwise demonstration gardens at its headquarters site. The gardens have seen a number of expansions since then and now comprise nearly five acres of display gardens called Conservation Garden Park. A new LEED Platinum-designed Education Center was opened to the public in 2013. This center furthers opportunities for outreach and education.
