= Lions (Utah State Capitol) =

Pair of lion statues in Salt Lake City, Utah, U.S.

- Artist: Gavin Jack
- Location: Salt Lake City, Utah

Two pairs of lion sculpture are installed at the Utah State Capitol in Salt Lake City. The original statues were created by Gavin Jack with cement in 1915, and repaired by Ralphael Plescia in 1977. Replacements were sculpture by Nick Fairplay with Italian marble. The sculpture are known as Fortitude, Honor, Integrity, and Patience.

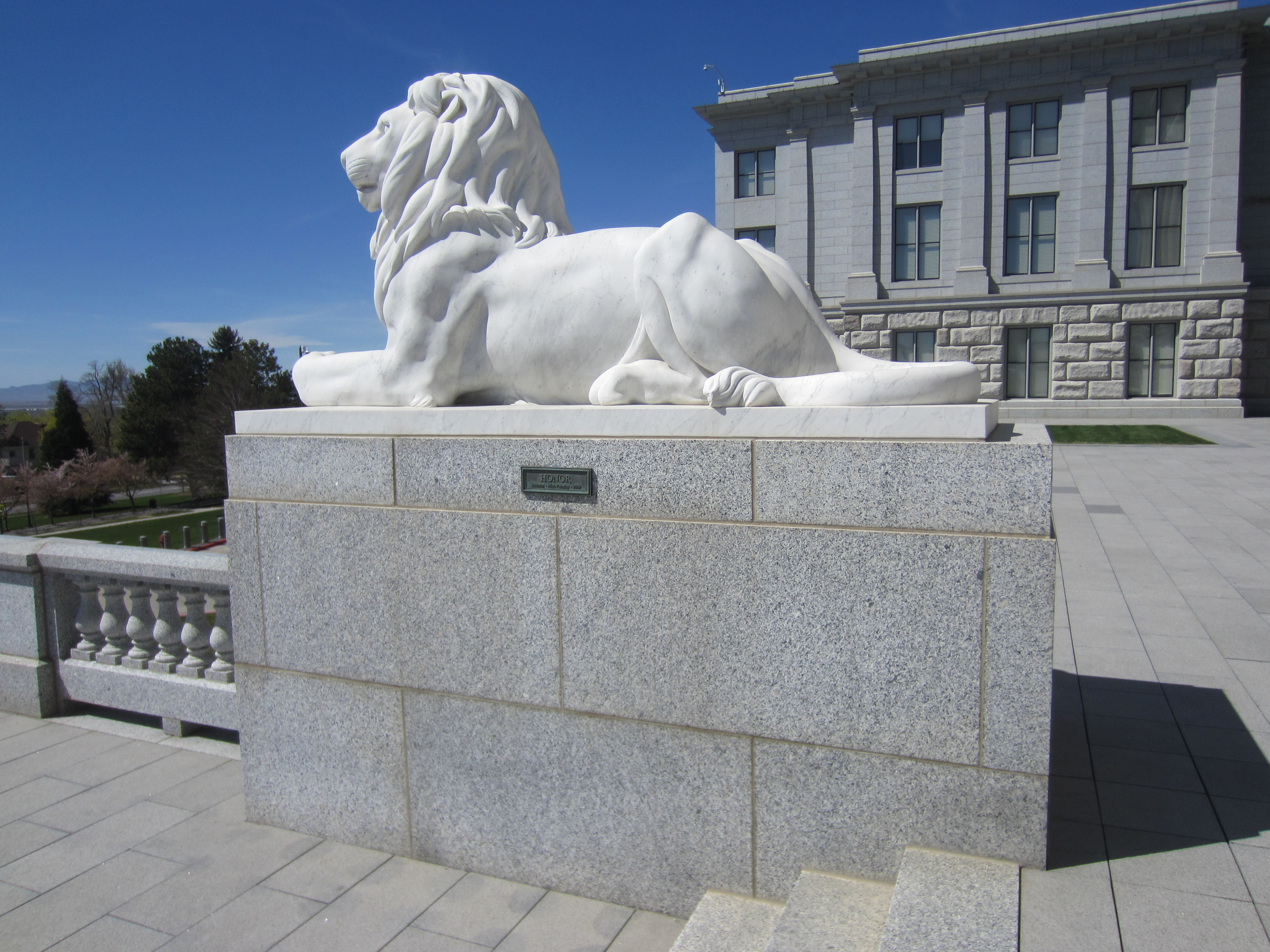
Honor

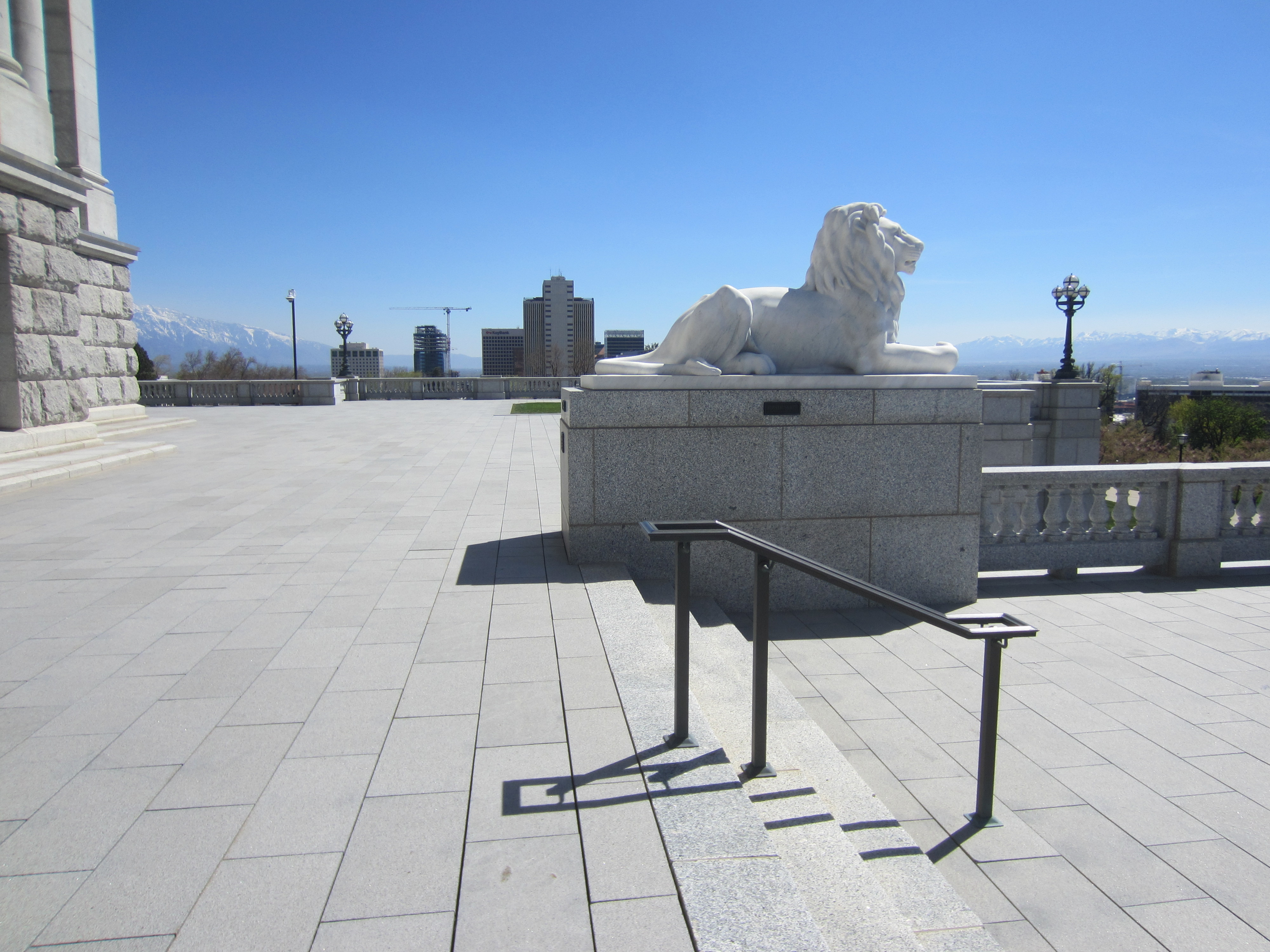
Patience

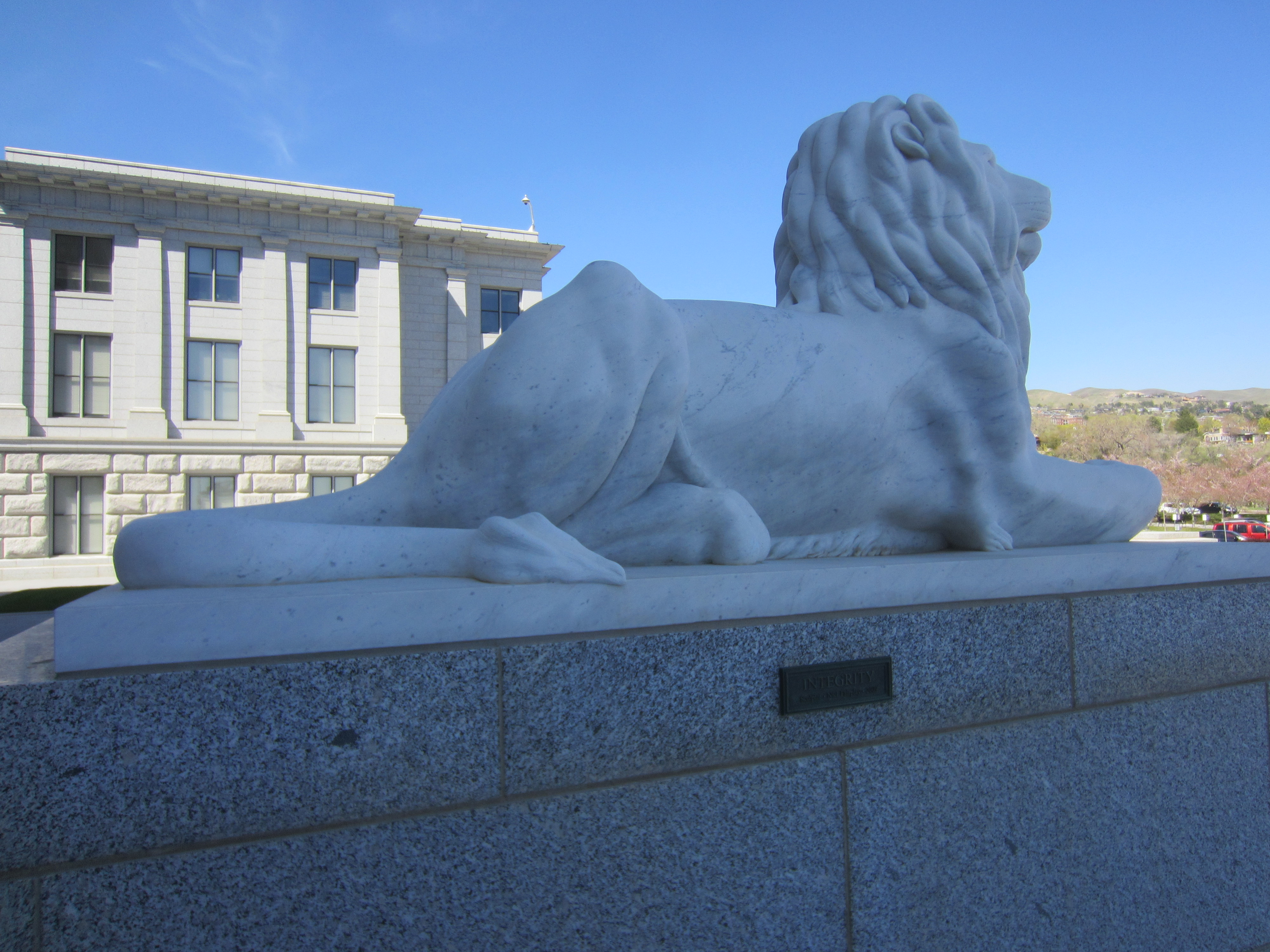
Integrity

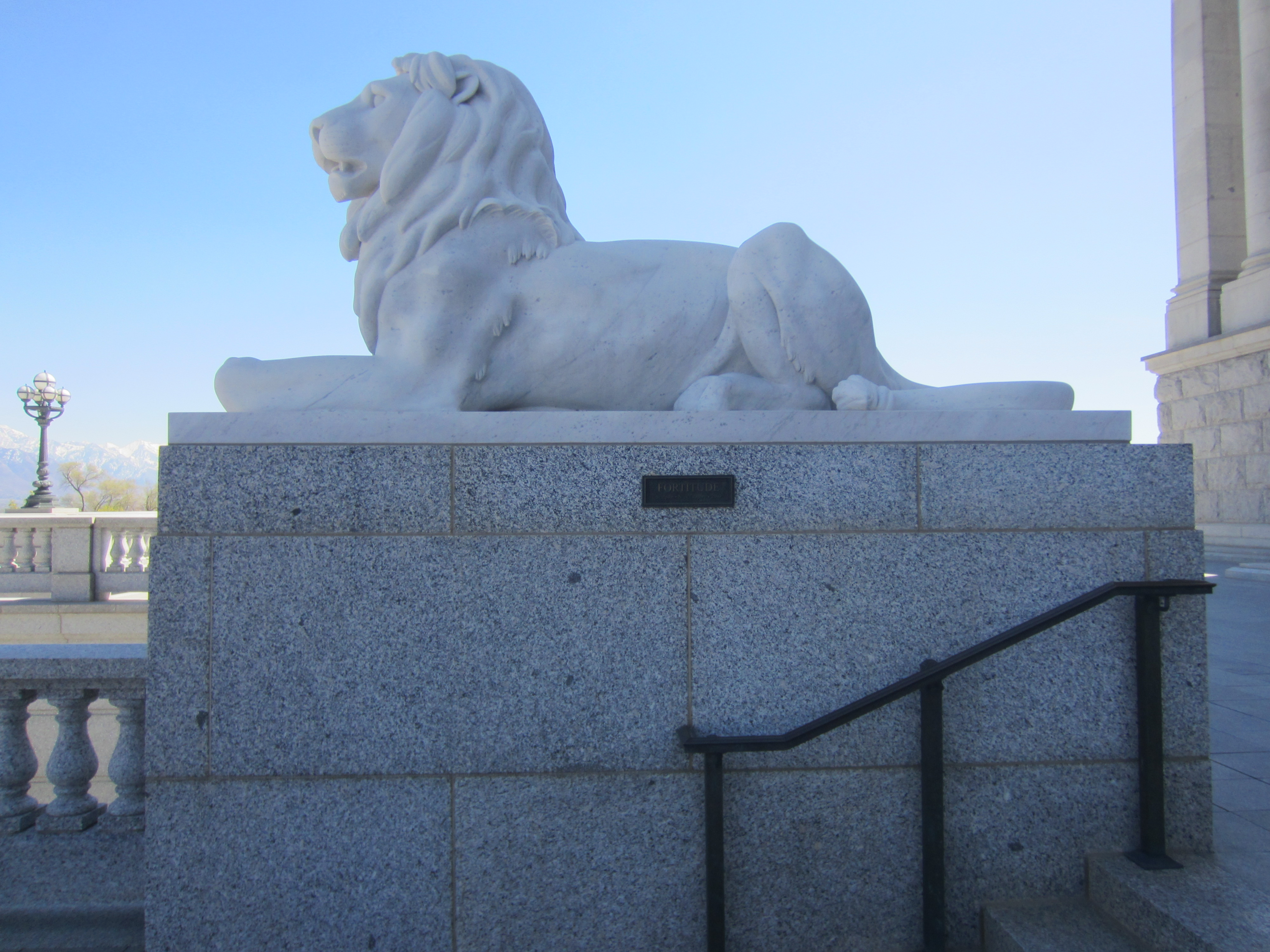
Fortitude
