= Utah and the Civil War Monument =

War memorial in Salt Lake City, Utah, U.S.

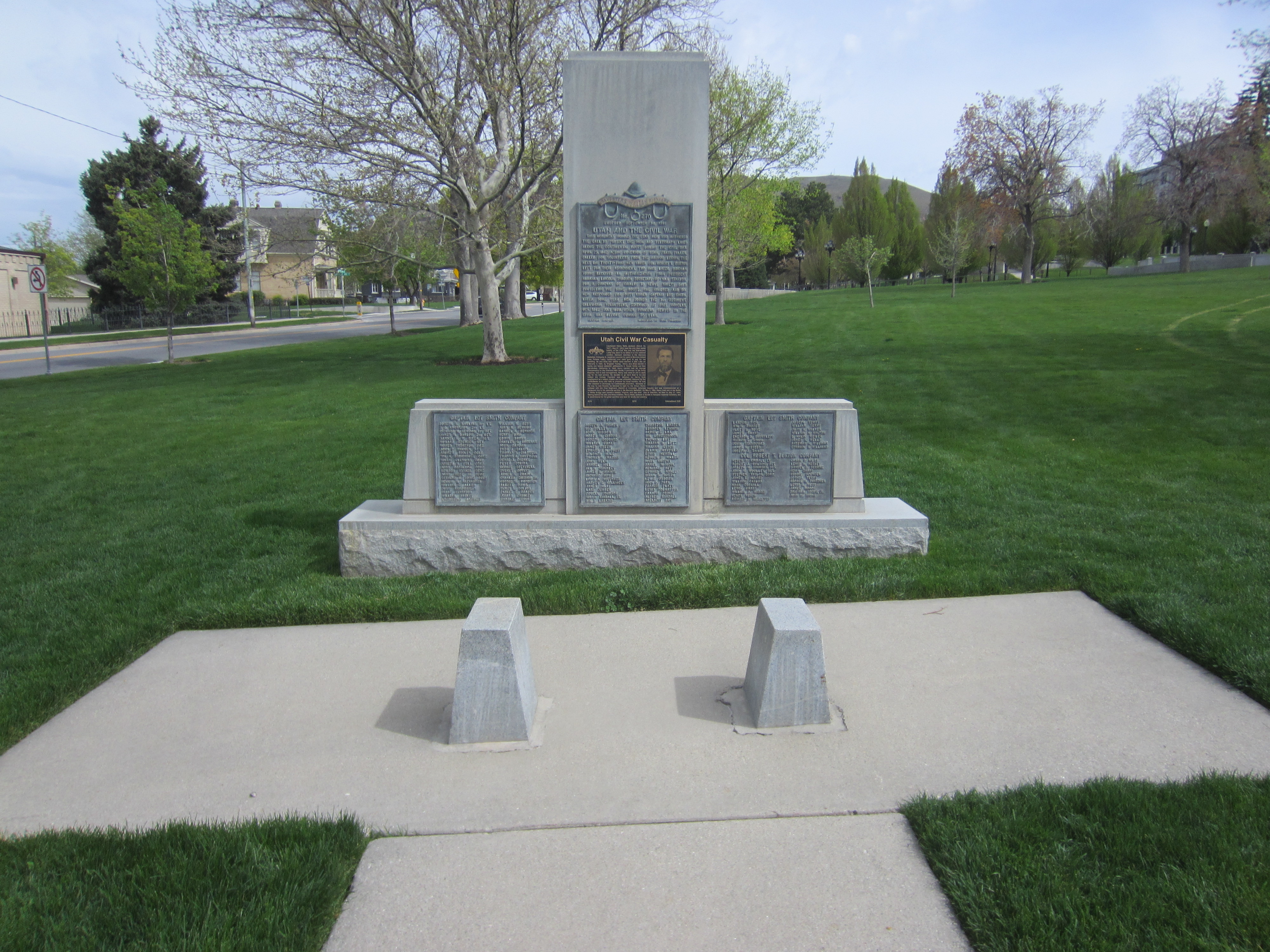
- The monument in 2021
- 40°46′36.1″N 111°53′25.5″W
- Location: Salt Lake City, Utah; United States

The Utah and the Civil War Monument is installed outside the Utah State Capitol in Salt Lake City, in the U.S. state of Utah.
