= Vietnam, Cambodia, and Laos Veterans Memorial =

Memorial in Salt Lake City, Utah, U.S.

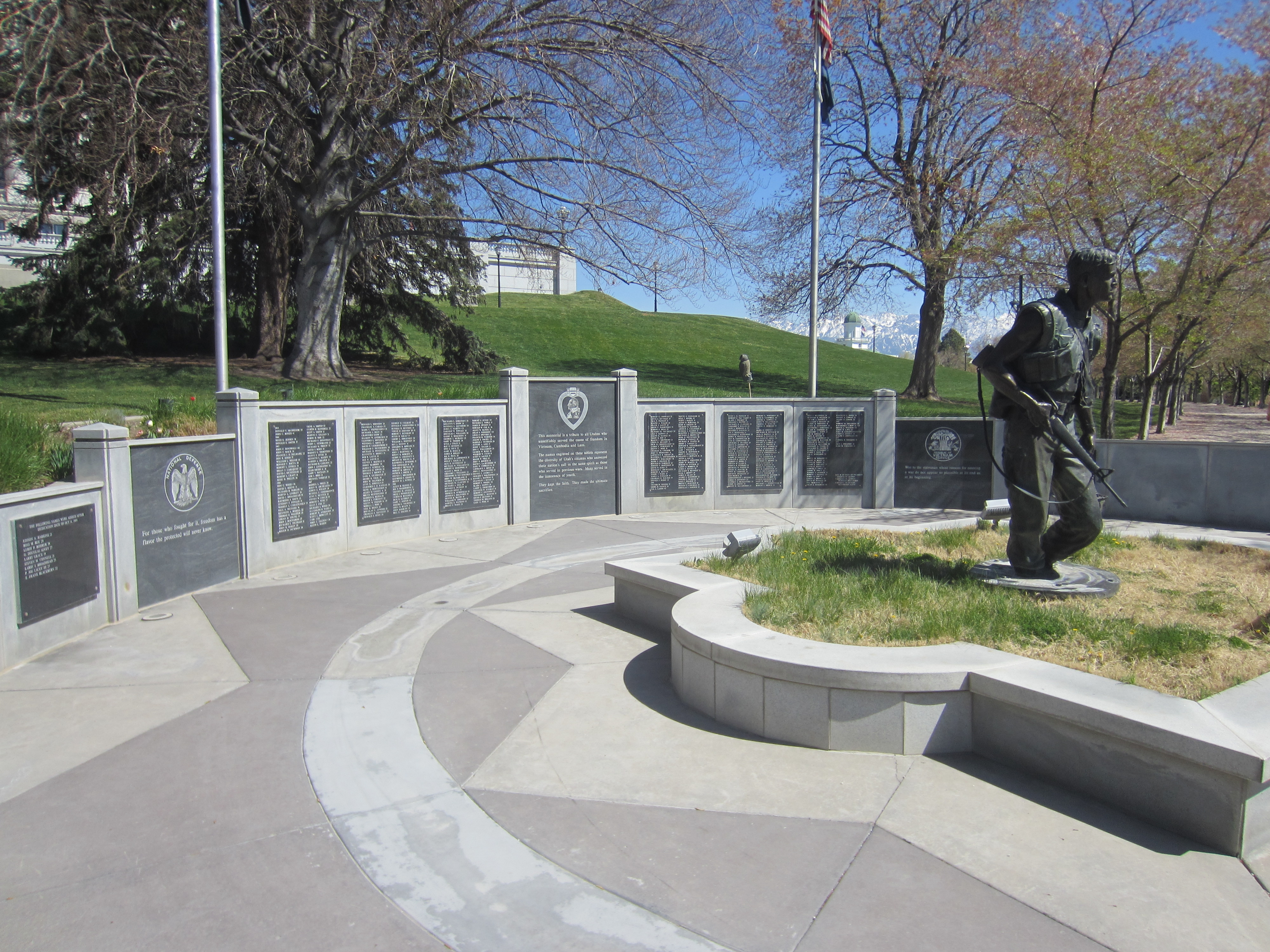
- The memorial in 2021
- Interactive map of Vietnam, Cambodia, and Laos Veterans Memorial
- Location: Salt Lake City, Utah, U.S.
- Coordinates: 40°46′38.1″N 111°53′23.6″W

The Vietnam, Cambodia, and Laos Veterans Memorial is installed outside the Utah State Capitol in Salt Lake City, in the U.S. state of Utah. Dedicated on October 14, 1989, the memorial features a bronze statue of a soldier by Clyde Ross Morgan and a circular wall by Mark Davenport.
