= Utah Law Enforcement Memorial =

Law enforcement memorial in Salt Lake City, Utah, U.S.

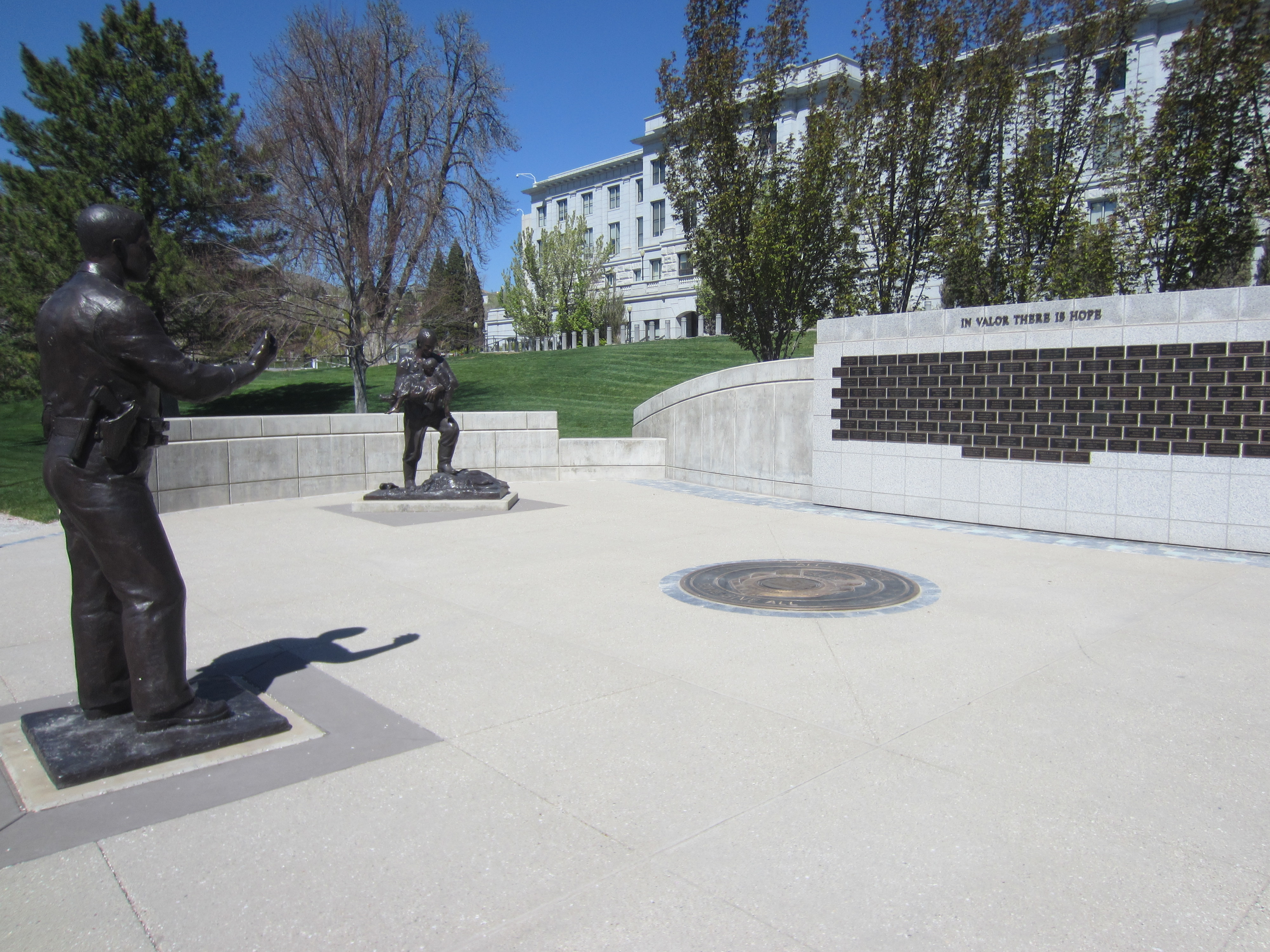
- The memorial in 2021
- Location: Salt Lake City, Utah, U.S.
- Coordinates: 40°46′39.7″N 111°53′23.4″W

The Utah Law Enforcement Memorial by Lena Toritch is installed outside the Utah State Capitol in Salt Lake City, in the U.S. state of Utah.

== Description and history ==
Dedicated on September 6, 2008, the memorial features three bronze statues and a stone wall.

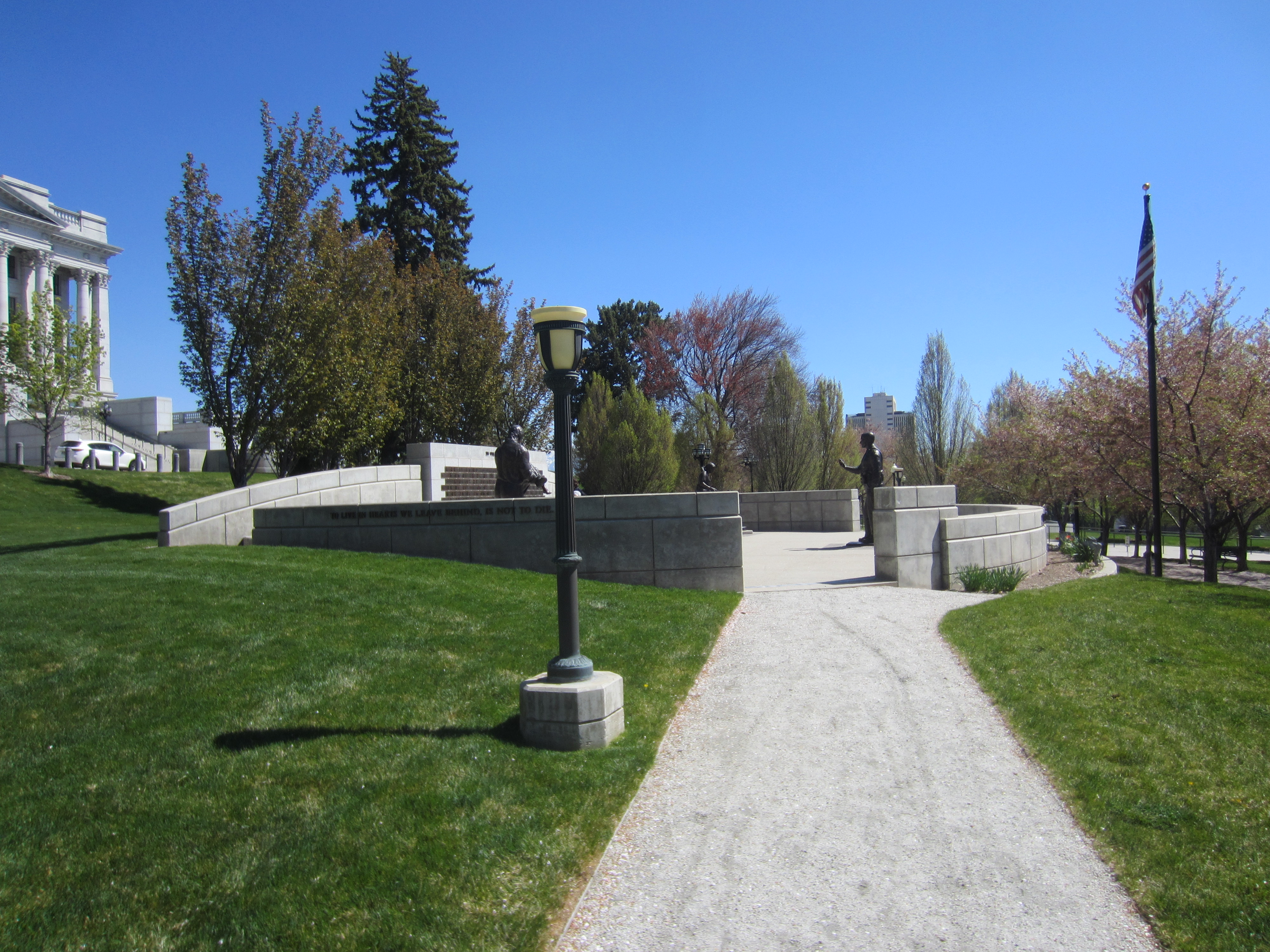

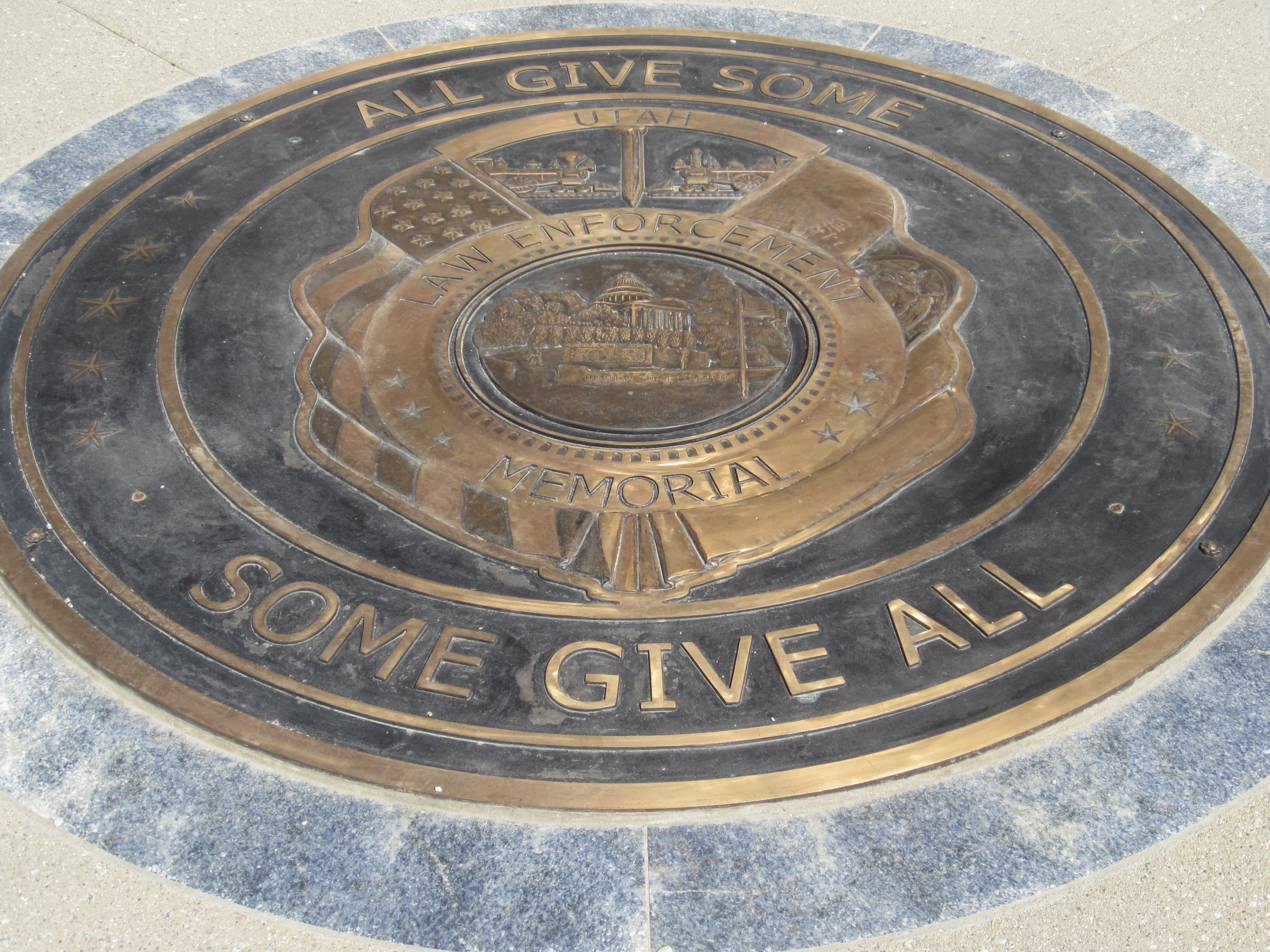
