= Engen brothers =

Norwegian-American skiers

The Engen brothers (born in Norway), emigrated to Utah, United States, where they became known for their skills as skiers. They also helped to develop skiing and especially ski jumping, in the Intermountain West.

== The brothers ==
- Alf Engen (May 15, 1909 – July 20, 1997)
- Sverre Engen (January 28, 1911 – April 4, 2001)
- Corey Engen (March 30, 1916 – May 9, 2006)
