= List of public art in Salt Lake City =

List of public artworks in Salt Lake City, Utah, United States

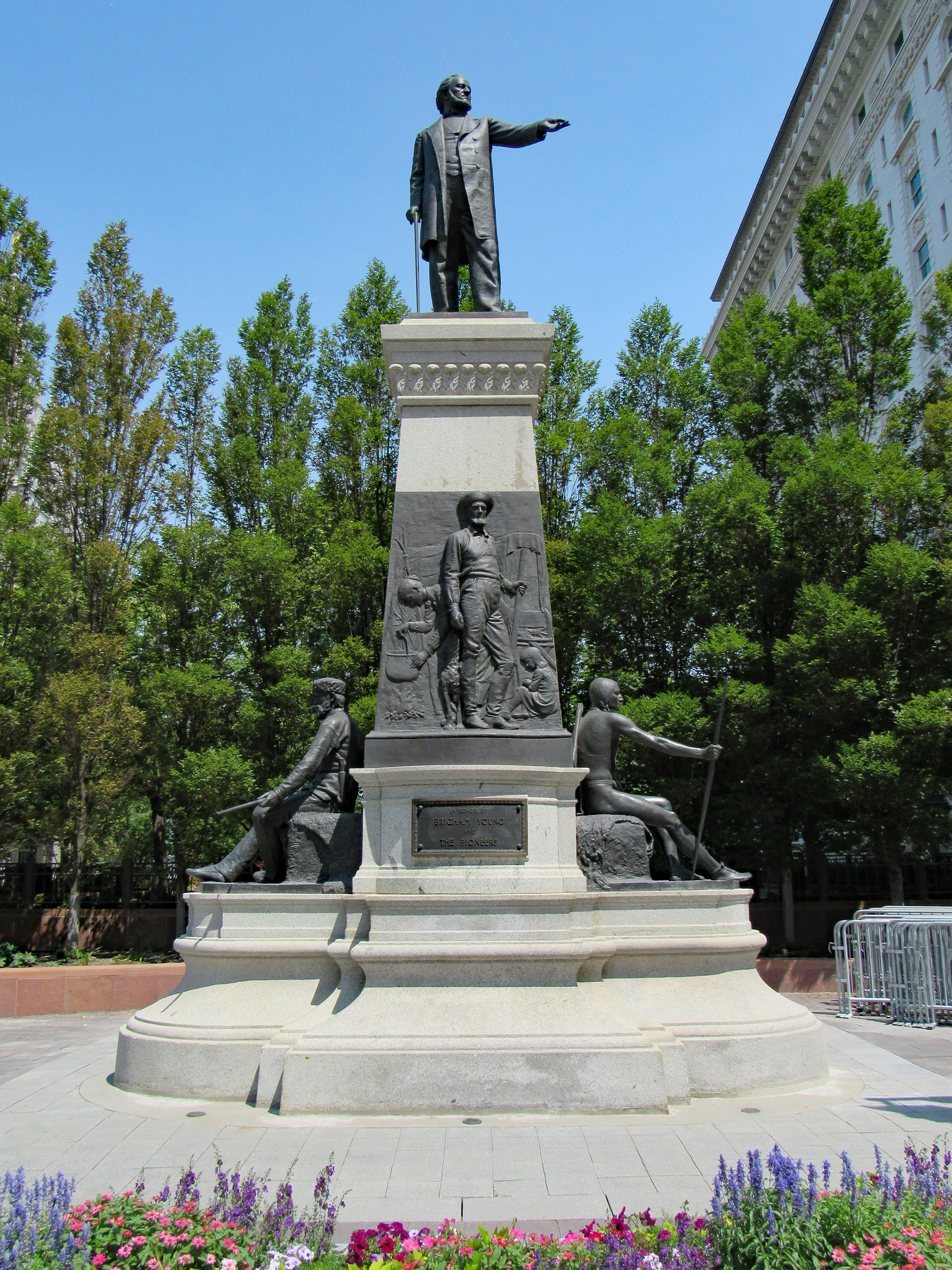
Brigham Young Monument

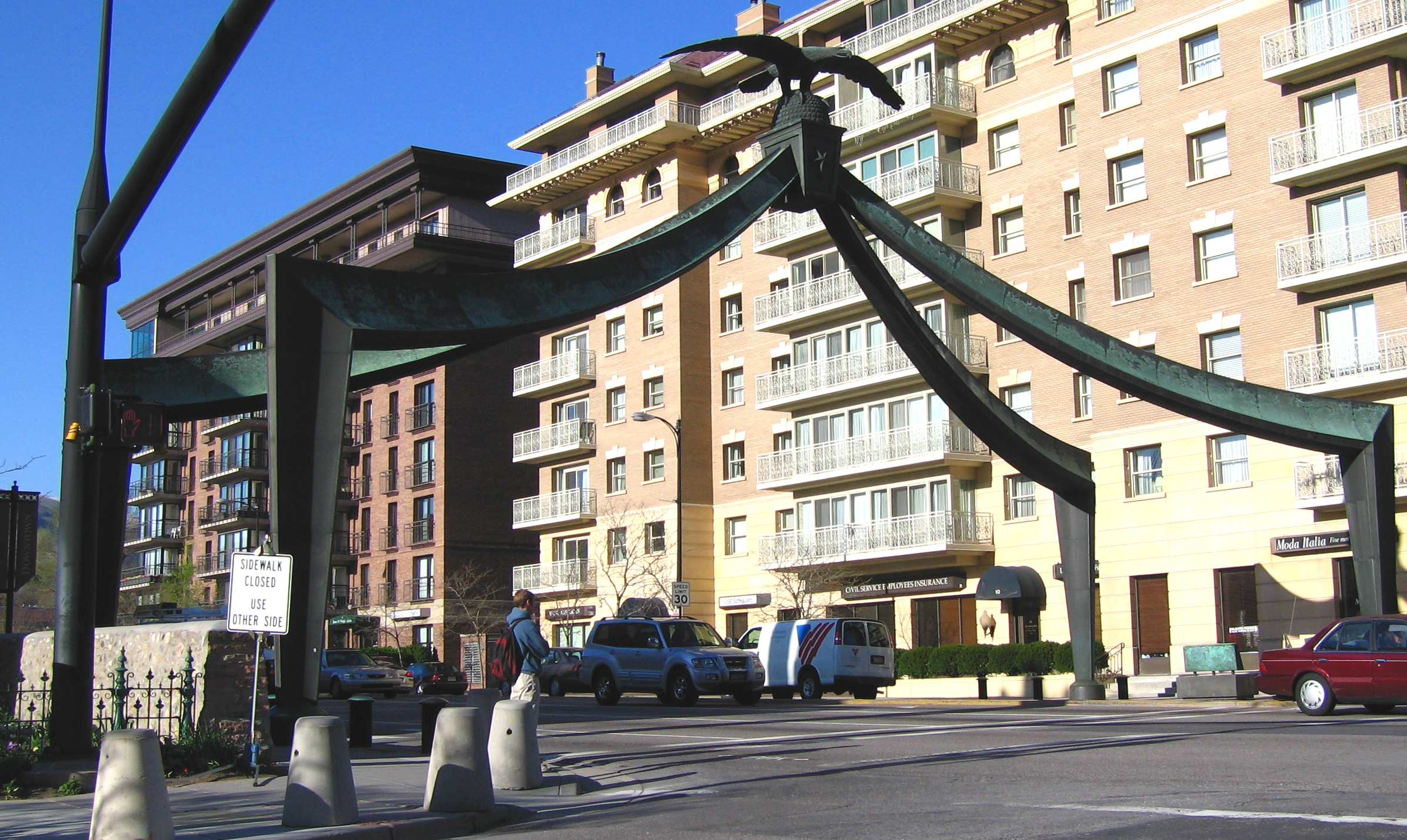
Eagle Gate

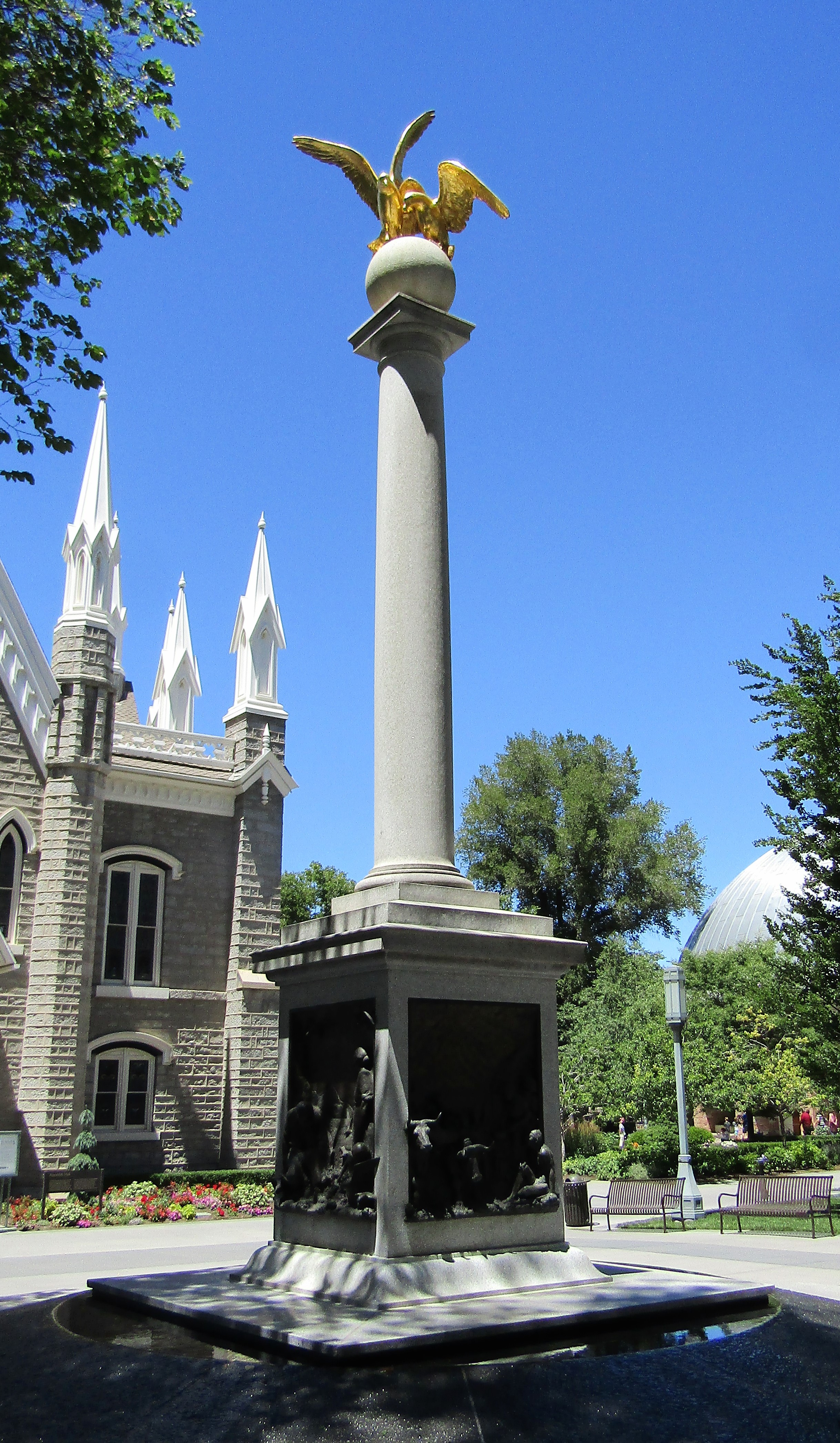
Seagull Monument

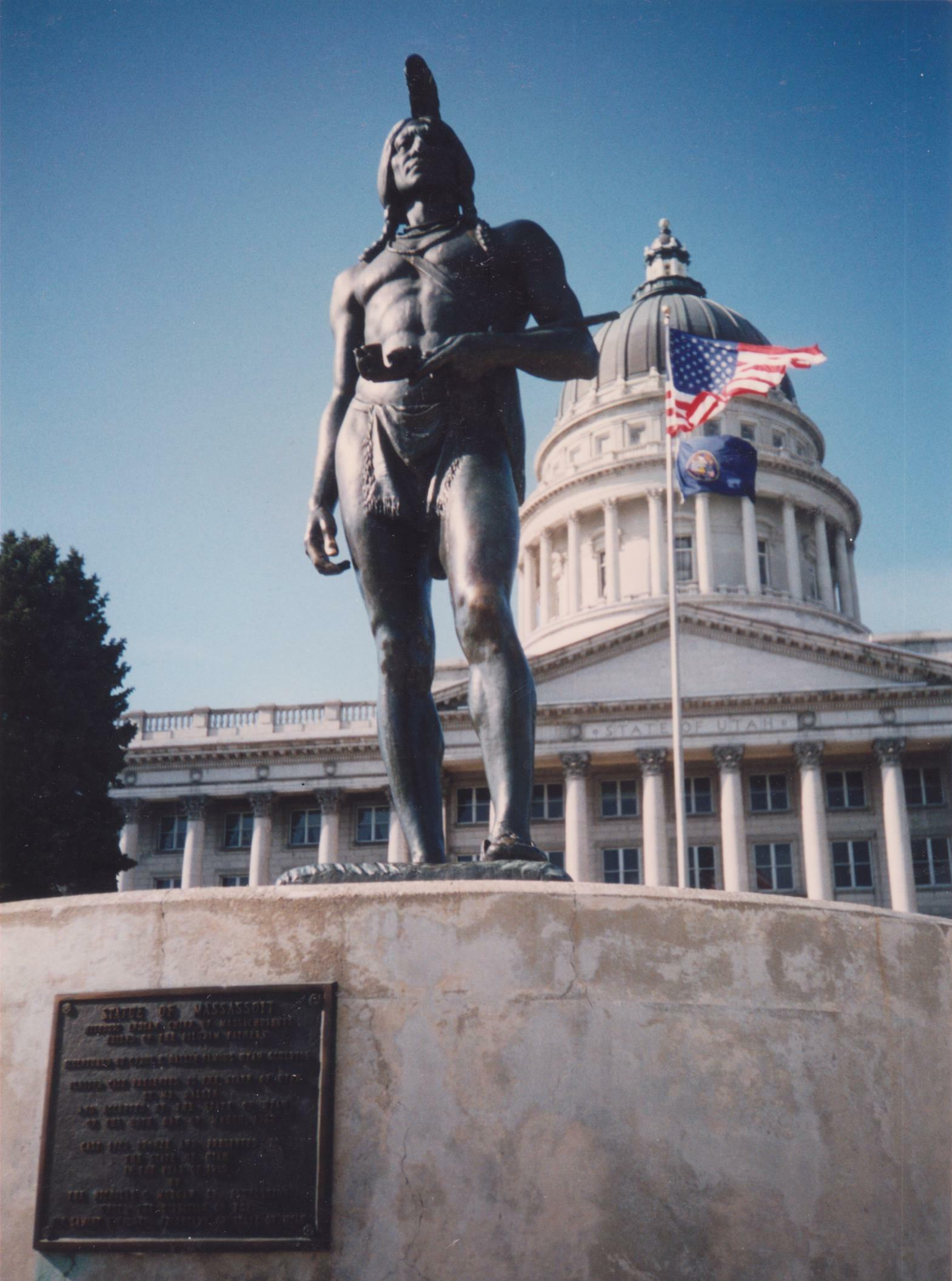
Statue of Massasoit

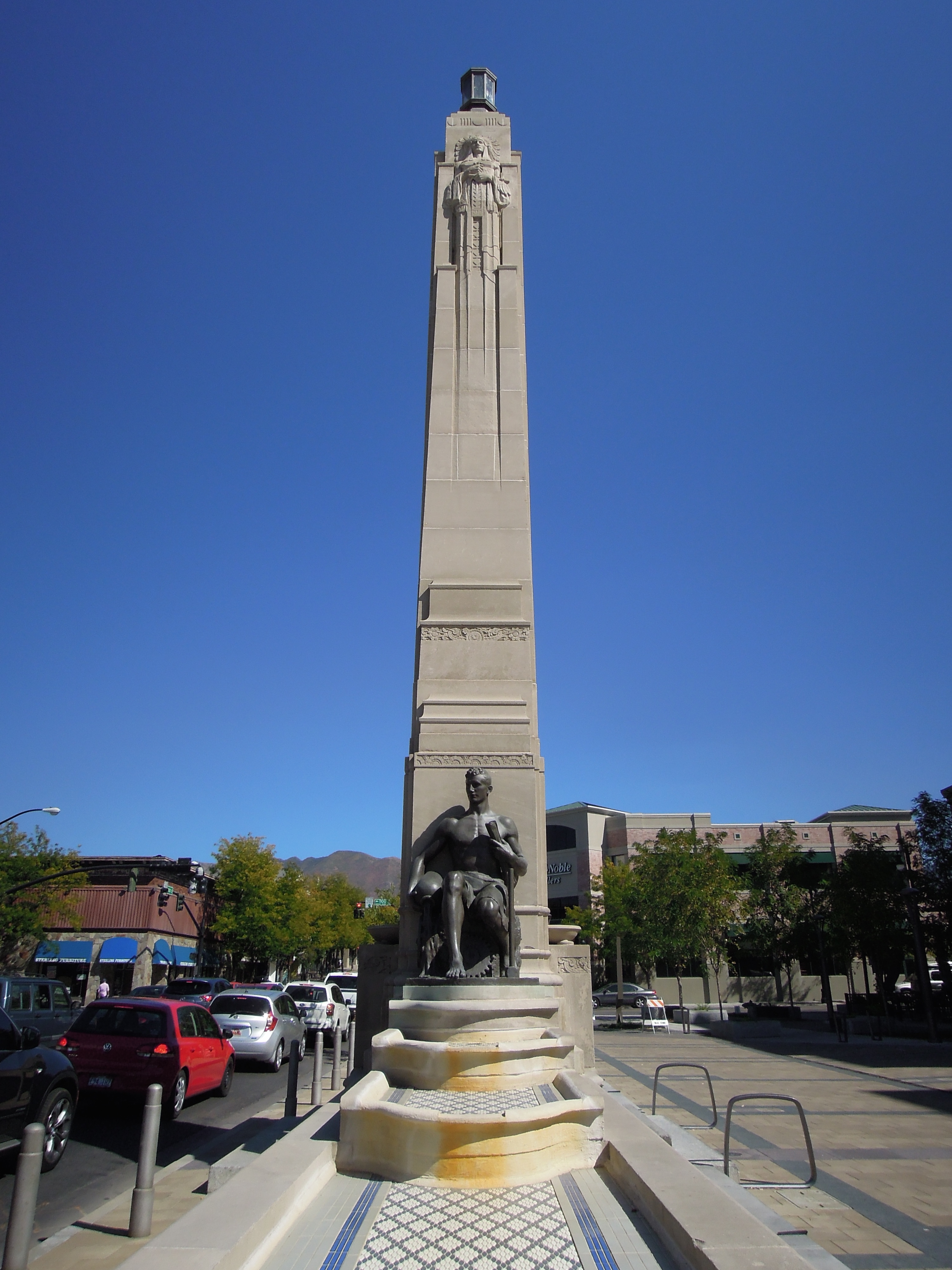
Sugar House Monument

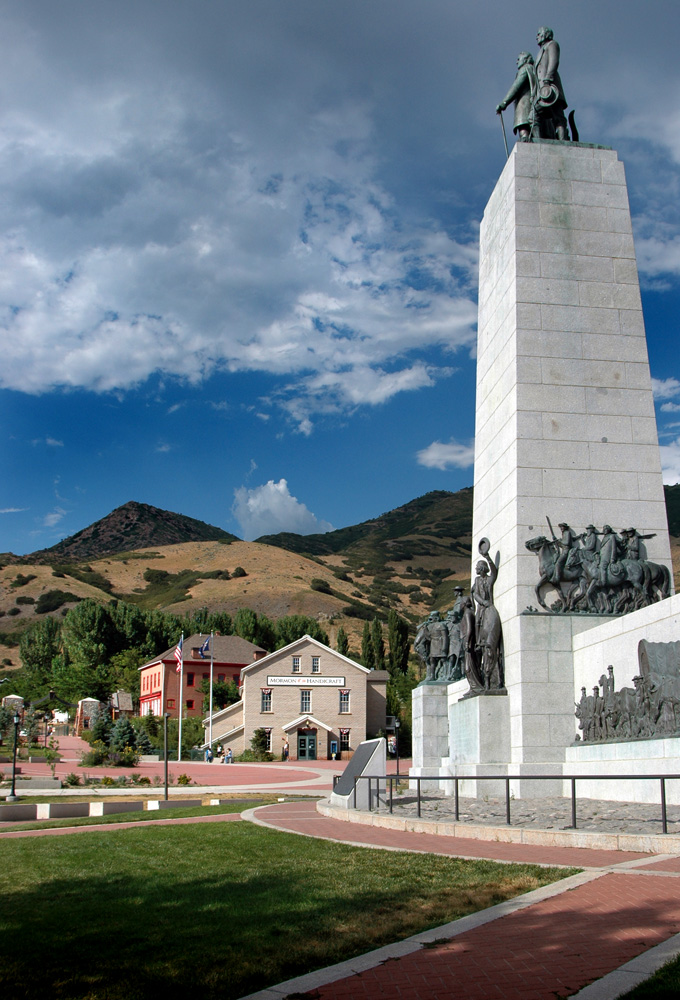
This Is the Place Monument

Salt Lake City has an extensive public art collection. Works have included:

- 145th Field Artillery Monument, Memory Grove
- 2002 Winter Olympics Countdown Clock, Arena station
- A Monument to Peace: Our Hope for the Children, Jordan Park
- Abstract Bronze Fountain
- All Is Well
- Allegorical Figures, City and County Building
- An Urban Allegory
- Angel Moroni, Temple Square
- Arch
- Asteroid Landed Softly
- Bauta Stone, Jordan Park
- Beehive sculptures, Utah State Capitol
- Benches, Pierpont Walkway
- Black Lives Matter street mural
- Brigham Young Monument
- Bronze Birds, Pierpont Walkway
- Charles R. Savage
- Bust of Mahatma Gandhi, International Peace Gardens, Jordan Park
- Celebration of Life Monument
- Chief Massasoit
- Children's Wall
- Coal Man Machine, First Security Bank
- Column 24, Salt Lake Art Center
- Counterpoint
- Crystal Grate, One Utah Center
- The Diver, Jordan Park
- The Doll and Dare
- Dolmen Replica, Jordan Park
- Dream Dog, Warm Springs Park
- Earthworks, Constitution Park
- Edgehill Ward Mural
- Fault Line, Fault Line Park
- Fire House Fire
- Fireman on Ladder
- Firemen Cutout
- Fruited Plain II, One Utah Center
- Gilgal
- Go for the Gold
- Handcart Pioneers, Temple Square
- Healing, University of Utah
- Hearts, Pierpont Walkway
- Herons in Flight
- Hyrum Smith, Temple Square
- Irish Cross, Jordan Park
- John Rockey Park, University of Utah
- Joseph Smith, Temple Square
- Korean War Wall of Honor, Memory Grove
- Landscape Architecture, Pierpont Walkway
- Lest We Forget, Pioneer Memorial Museum
- The Little Mermaid, Jordan Park
- Lupine Meadow Roll
- Lupita, the Woman, Guadalupe Park
- May We Have Peace
- Morgan Commercial and Normal College Marker
- The Mormon Battalion War Memorial
- Nauvoo Bell, Temple Square – includes Benevolence and Pioneering
- Olmec Head Replica, Jordan Park
- One Hundred Birds
- Our Lady of Beauraing, Belgium
- Out of the Blue, 9th and 9th Neighborhood
- Pagoda, Memory Grove
- (Pair of Cougars)
- The Peace Child of Hiroshima, University of Utah
- Peace Cradle, Gallivan Center and Jordan Park's International Peace Gardens
- Pierpont Walkway Water, Pierpont Walkway
- Pioneer Monument
- Places for Birds, One Utah Center
- Places for People
- Point of View, Salt Palace
- The Pony Express, Pioneer Trails State Park
- Portal, One Utah Center
- Preaching Buddha, Jordan Park
- Puepahk Tugypahgyn Noomwevehchuh Psehdtuhneeyet, Triad Center
- Restoration of the Aaronic Priesthood, Temple Square
- Restoration of the Melchizedek Priesthood, Temple Square
- Rococo-Coco
- Sculptured Wall
- Seagull Monument
- Seated Mermaid, Jordan Park
- Sidewalk Piece in Parts
- Solar Wind, Salt Lake Community College
- Sorrow
- Spirit Poles, International Peace Gardens, Jordan Park
- Statue of Eliza R. Snow
- Statue of Patrick Edward Connor
- Statue of Vasilios Priskos
- Story Wall, One Utah Center
- Stream of Life, City Creek Center
- Sugar House Pioneer Monument, Sugar House
- This Is the Place Monument
- Three Football Players, University of Utah
- Through the Shelter of Love
- The Tree
- Tribute to the Nation's Constitution and Flag
- Two Chinese Lions, Jordan Park
- Uinta
- Untitled (Allen), Wells Mini Park
- Untitled (Caravaglia), Federal Building
- Untitled (Johnston), Liberty Park
- Untitled (Riggs), Parks and Recreation building
- Untitled (Riswold), Memory Grove
- Untitled (Smith), First Security Bank
- Untitled (Strand, Nobis), One Utah Center
- Untitled (Swain), Taufer Park
- Untitled Fountain
- Utah Jazz mural
- Utah Sandscape, One Utah Center
- Utah Women 2020
- Ute Brave, University of Utah
- Water Walk, One Utah Center
- Wildlife Wall, One Utah Center
- Windwheel #9
- Zucker Fountain, Memory Grove
