= Riswold =

Riswold is a surname. Notable people with the surname include:

- Gilbert Riswold (1882–1938), American sculptor
- Jim Riswold (1957–2024), American advertising executive
