= An Urban Allegory =

An Urban Allegory may refer to:

- An Urban Allegory (sculpture), a 1992 sculpture by Neil Hadlock
- An Urban Allegory (film), a 2024 French short film
