= Counterpoint (disambiguation) =

In music, counterpoint is a texture involving the simultaneous sounding of separate melodies or lines "against" each other.

Counterpoint may also refer to:

== Music ==
- Counterpoint (Jason Webley album), 2002
- Counterpoint (In the Nursery album), 1989
- Counterpoints (Argent album), 1975
- Counterpoints (McCoy Tyner album), 2004
- Counterpoint (Schenker), the second volume of Heinrich Schenker's New Musical Theories and Fantasies
- "Counterpoint", a song by Delphic from the album Acolyte

== Film, television and radio ==
- Counterpoint (radio programme), a musical quiz show on BBC Radio 4
- "Counterpoint" (Star Trek: Voyager), a 1998 episode from the fifth season of Star Trek: Voyager
- Counterpoint (Radio National), an Australian Broadcasting Corporation radio program
- Counterpoint (film), a 1968 war film starring Charlton Heston
- Counterpoint (TV series), a Canadian current affairs television series on CBC Television in 1967

== Other ==
- Counterpoint (horse), a thoroughbred racehorse
- Counterpoint (publisher), an American publishing house
- Counterpoint (sculpture), a 1979 bronze sculpture by Dennis Smith

== See also ==
- Counter Points, a spin-off of the web political news and commentary series Breaking Points
- ContraPoints, a YouTube channel
- "Point/Counterpoint", a segment on CBS News' 60 Minutes (1971–1979)
- "Point/Counterpoint", a parody of the 60 Minutes segment on Saturday Night Live's Weekend Update
- Point Counter Point, a 1928 novel by Aldous Huxley
- "Point/Counterpoint", a song by Streetlight Manifesto from the album Everything Goes Numb
- Counterplot (disambiguation)
- Counterargument
