= Go for the Gold =

Sculpture by Jonathan Bronson

- The sculpture at the Olympic Legacy Plaza in The Gateway in Salt Lake City, April 2021
- Artist: Jonathan Bronson
- Location: Salt Lake City, Utah, United States
- 40°46′10.1″N 111°54′15.5″W

Go for the Gold is a sculpture by Jonathan Bronson.

== Description ==
Two copies are installed in Salt Lake City, Utah, United States. One sculpture is installed on the University of Utah campus and the other is displayed at The Gateway's Olympic Legacy Plaza. Donated by Robert L. Rice and Kenneth O. Melby, the sculptures depicts a skier.

Sculpture on the University of Utah campus with rock in background, April 2021

== See also ==
- List of public art in Salt Lake City
