= Olympic Legacy Plaza =

Public plaza in Salt Lake City, Utah, U.S.

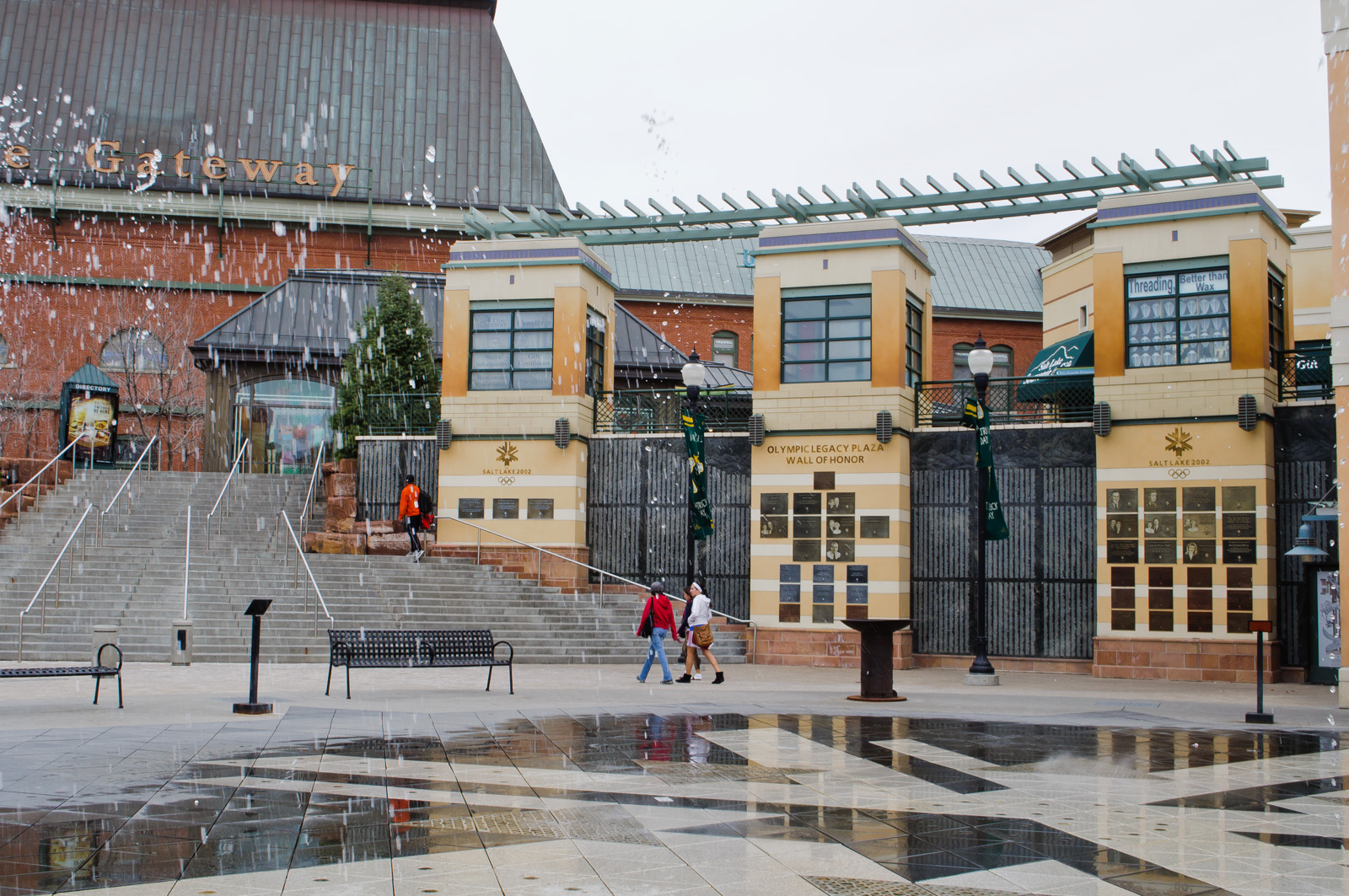
- The plaza in March 2012

- Location within Utah Location within the United States
- Location: Salt Lake City, Utah; United States
- Coordinates: 40°46′9″N 111°54′14″W

Olympic Legacy Plaza is a public plaza in The Gateway shopping center in Salt Lake City, Utah, United States.

== Description ==
The plaza opened in 2001, ahead of the 2002 Winter Olympics. It features a large fountain and walls with inscriptions displaying the names of Team 2002 volunteers. Go for the Gold is also installed in the plaza.

Construction of the plaza was partly funded by a "buy a brick" program.

== See also ==
- Olympic and Paralympic Cauldron Plaza (Salt Lake City)
