= Monument to Women Memorial Garden =

Statuary park in Illinois, United States

Coordinates: 40°33′10.3″N 91°23′23.3″W

- This piece of the Monument to Women is a bronze statue titled Woman and Her Talents, by Dennis Smith.
- Interactive map of Monument to Women Memorial Garden
- Nearest city: Nauvoo, Illinois
- Area: 2 acres (0.81 ha)
- Established: June 30, 1978
- Designer: Durell Nelson
- Operator: Church of Jesus Christ of Latter-day Saints

Monument to Women Memorial Garden is a statuary monument in Nauvoo, Illinois, owned by the Church of Jesus Christ of Latter-day Saints (LDS Church). The monument is a two-acre garden with twelve statues depicting traditional women's roles. It was constructed in the 1970s to serve as a replacement for the Relief Society monument and designed to promote the woman's values which the LDS Church believed were threatened by the Equal Rights Amendment (ERA). Dennis Smith and Florence Hansen sculpted the bronze statues and church president Spencer W. Kimball dedicated the monument on June 30, 1978.

== Background ==
=== 1933 Relief Society monument ===
During the Great Depression, the LDS apostle George Albert Smith and Relief Society president Louise Robison worked to place a monument for the Relief Society in Nauvoo. They received permission from Frederick M. Smith, president of the Reorganized Church of Jesus Christ of Latter Day Saints, to place the monument on his church's property, the former location of Joseph Smith's Red Brick Store. The monument was dedicated on July 26, 1933. It was moved to the Nauvoo Temple site in 1952, and moved once again to the site of the Monument to Women Memorial Garden in 1988.

=== Proposed replacement ===
During the 1970s, the LDS Church opposed the proposed Equal Rights Amendment (ERA) because church leaders believed it endangered traditional moral values safeguarding womanhood and the family. In 1973, General Relief Society General President Belle S. Spafford told church president Spencer W. Kimball that the Relief Society monument needed to be replaced. In 1974, Kimball asked Spafford's successor, Barbara B. Smith, if she would be interested in working on a replacement monument. Smith envisioned that this new monument would help defend the traditional women's values that she thought were endangered by the ERA. Smith had the sculptor Florence Hansen make a clay model of a woman in pioneer clothing with a child. Smith was not fully satisfied with this sculpture, so on November 19, 1975, several artists presented their works and ideas to a selection committee composed of leaders in the Priesthood and Relief Society.

The sculptor Dennis Smith proposed that the replacement monument could be a two-acre sculpture garden, spotlighting phases of womenhood in twelve statues. One of the committee members, apostle Mark E. Petersen, suggested that they commission Dennis Smith to create eleven statues for this monument and that they commission Florence Hansen to create the sculpture of the pioneer woman and child. The committee unanimously accepted this idea. Dennis Smith and Hansen signed contracts with the Relief Society and were given priesthood blessings for their upcoming sculpture work on February 4, 1976. The Relief Society announced that the new monument would be a reminder that "the woman in the contemporary world is not far removed from the woman of an earlier era."

=== Construction ===
At first, the monument was scheduled to be completed and dedicated on March 17, 1977, the 135th anniversary of the organizational meeting of the Relief Society. However, this deadline would be postponed to gather more funding and allow the sculptors to finish their work. Smith and Hansen worked on their sculptures in the basement studio of Smith's house in Alpine, Utah.

Hansen accepted a request from the LDS Church's leadership to create another statue, one depicting Joseph Smith and his wife Emma Smith. The statues started to take form in the winter of 1978. The sculptors envisioned where they wanted to place the statues and chose scriptural verses which they believed fit best with their works.

At first, the Relief Society struggled to raise enough funds for the monument. Some of the funding came from the Relief Society's wheat fund from the First World War. When Kimball embarked on a tour of Latin America and the Middle East, he encouraged women to contribute to the monument. Dorothy G. Brim collected all funding for the monument. All necessary funding was gathered by March 1978. Barbara B. Smith and Edythe K. Watson then traveled to Nauvoo to select a site for the monument. They selected a two-acre site behind the church's Nauvoo visitors' center. Otis Hamilton was appointed as manager of the volunteers who gardened the site. Durell Nelson designed the park and would act as its caretaker after dedication.

== Dedication ==
=== Theatrical production ===
In March 1978, production began for Because of Elizabeth, an outdoor musical that would be performed at the dedication of the monument. The cast and crew for the play consisted of about 240 members of the Champaign Illinois Stake. The play took place in Nauvoo in the 1840s and portrayed traditional women's roles as the solution to society's problems.

The Champaign Stake President Joseph R. Larsen was the assistant producer, and Moana Bennett wrote the play's script. Larry Bastian wrote and arranged the music. Duane Hiatt wrote the lyrics. One of the play's songs was written by Nonie Sorenson. The music was recorded in London, and the chorus was recorded in California.

=== Dedicatory services ===
Dedicatory services started on June 27, 1978, the anniversary of the death of Joseph Smith and his brother, Hyrum Smith. Nearly 7,200 Latter-day Saint women gathered on this date to attend the services. News reporters covered the services and interviewed the sculptors and church leaders. The services started in with remarks by President Kimball and President Smith at an invitation-only dinner banquet. Banquet guests toured the garden and attended a performance of Because of Elizabeth.

Spencer W. Kimball dedicated the monument in ceremonies on June 28–30. On the first day of these ceremonies, around 2,500 women attended the dedicatory services in a large, yellow-striped tent. Kimball addressed these women and offered a dedicatory prayer. Bethine C. Church read a letter from United States first lady Rosalynn Carter. On the second day of dedication, apostle Bruce R. McConkie spoke on receiving revelation and having faith. President of the Quorum of the Twelve ApostlesEzra Taft Benson encouraged "the elect women of the kingdom of God" to be "wives and mothers of Zion". Janath R. Cannon compared the memorial gardens to the Garden of Eden and the Garden of Gethsemane, and Marian R. Boyer praised the monument's two sculptors.

Norma W. Matheson, wife of Utah governor Scott M. Matheson, extended greetings from the people of Utah. Ilana Rovner, assistant deputy to Illinois governor James R. Thompson, read a certificate of appreciation to the Relief Society and proclaimed that June 28, 1978, would be National Monument to Women Day in Illinois. Apostle L. Tom Perry also spoke at the services. The visitors' center offered order forms for mementos for the event.

== Description ==
The title of the Monument to Women is "Circles of a Woman's Life". The Relief Society monument from 1933 is near the entrance and the Joseph and Emma Smith statue is placed just inside the garden. While most of the statues in this monument are life-sized, the central figure titled Woman is larger. Four statues surround Woman, depicting a woman reading, a woman praying, a woman sculpting, and a woman reaching out to help others.

The next circle of statues depicts a woman's influence in the family. The statue Courtship for Eternity is placed at the entrance, along with Joyful Moment, In the Family Circle, In Her Mother's Footsteps, Preparing Her Son, and Teaching with Love. The final statue, Fulfillment, is slightly elevated from all the other statues and depicts an old woman binding a double wedding ring quilt.

According to Susan Easton Black, the monument has "gone unnoticed by succeeding generations of Latter-day Saint women." She described the monument in 2015, writing "the brick circles are cracked, and the landscape is so overgrown that the statues cannot be seen from the parking lot of the Nauvoo Visitors' Center."
