= Counterplot =

A counterplot refers to a plot made in opposition to another. It may also refer to:

- Counterplot (film), a 1959 crime film
- The Counterplot, a 1924 novel by Hope Mirrlees
- "Counter Plot", fifth episode of the 1965–66 Doctor Who serial The Daleks' Master Plan
- The Counterplot, an episode of the 1919 serial The Lightning Raider
- Counterplot, a 1969 book by Edward Jay Epstein

== See also ==
- L'Étourdi ou les Contretemps - A French play meaning "The Blunderer, or the Counterplots"
- V.V., or Plots and Counterplots - A 1865 short story by Louisa May Alcott
- Counterpoint (disambiguation)
