= The Doll and Dare =

Sculpture by Dennis Smith in Salt Lake City, Utah, U.S.

- Artist: Dennis Smith
- Year: 1978
- Medium: Bronze sculpture
- Dimensions: 1.8 m × 1.2 m × 1.2 m (6 ft × 4 ft × 4 ft)
- Location: Salt Lake City, Utah, United States
- 40°44′54.9″N 111°52′19.3″W

The Doll and Dare is a 1978 bronze sculpture by Dennis Smith, installed in Salt Lake City, Utah, United States. The sculpture measures approximately 6 by 4 by 4 feet (1.8 m × 1.2 m × 1.2 m) and rests on a concrete base which measures approximately 6 by 5 by 5 feet (1.8 m × 1.5 m × 1.5 m). It depicts two figure groups: a young girl standing on one pedestal and holding a doll, and another of two young boys on another pedestal, with one pulling up the other. The artwork was surveyed by the Smithsonian Institution's "Save Outdoor Sculpture" program in 1993.
