= Bust of Charles Roscoe Savage =

Sculpture in Salt Lake City, Utah, U.S.

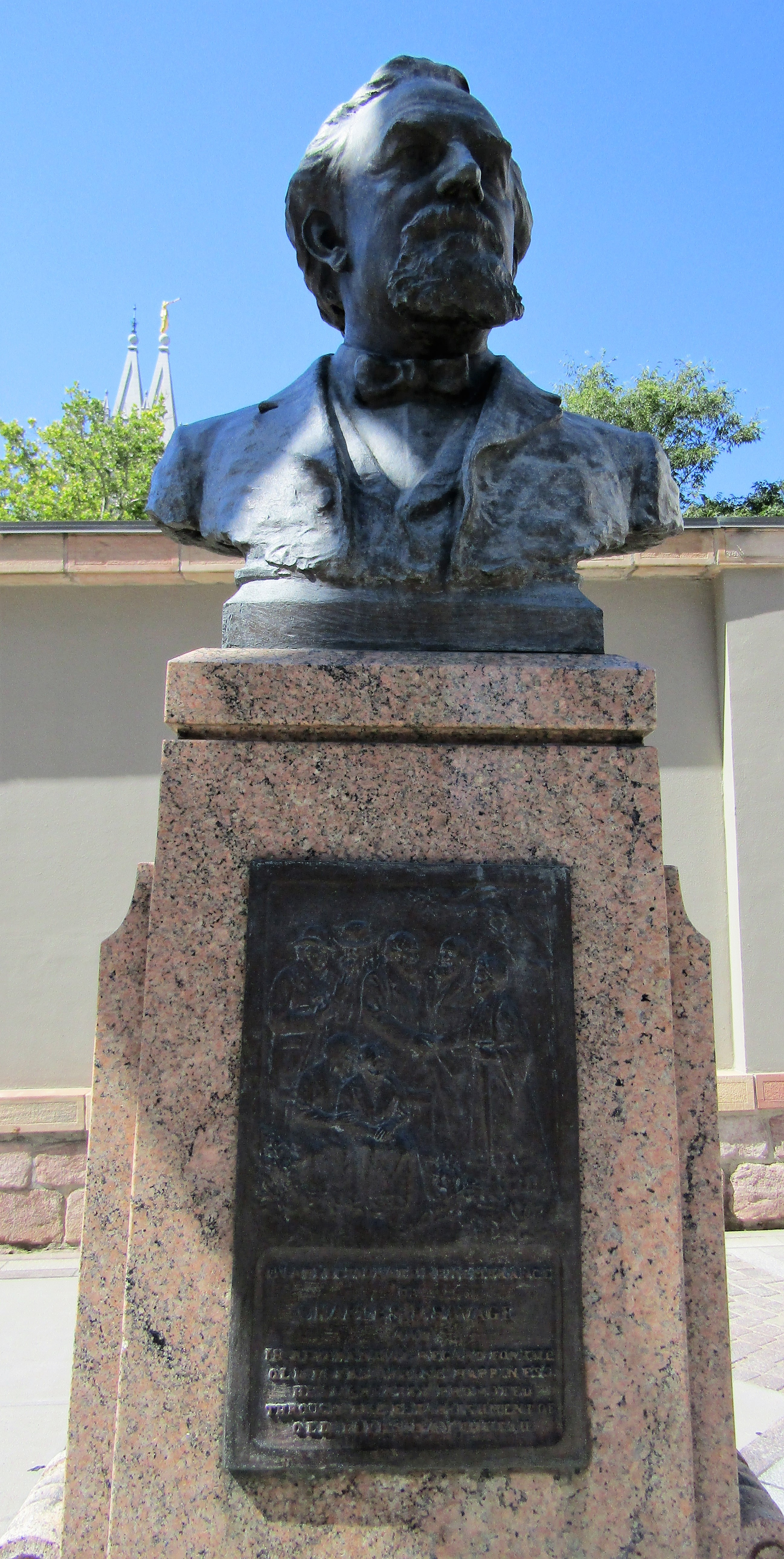
- The bust in 2017
- Artist: Gilbert Riswold
- Year: 1928
- Medium: Bronze sculpture
- Subject: Charles Roscoe Savage
- Dimensions: 2.1 m × 0.30 m × 0.30 m (7 ft × 1 ft × 1 ft)
- Location: Salt Lake City, Utah, United States; 40°46′10.1″N 111°53′29″W

A 1928 bust of Charles Roscoe Savage by Gilbert Riswold is installed in Salt Lake City, Utah, United States.

== Description and history ==
Located at the intersection of Main Street and South Temple, the bronze sculpture measures approximately 7 x 1 x 1 feet and rests on a stone base which measures approximately 6 x 5 x 3 feet. It was surveyed by the Smithsonian Institution's "Save Outdoor Sculpture!" program in 1993.
