= Beehive sculptures (Utah State Capitol) =

Sculptures in Salt Lake City, Utah, U.S.

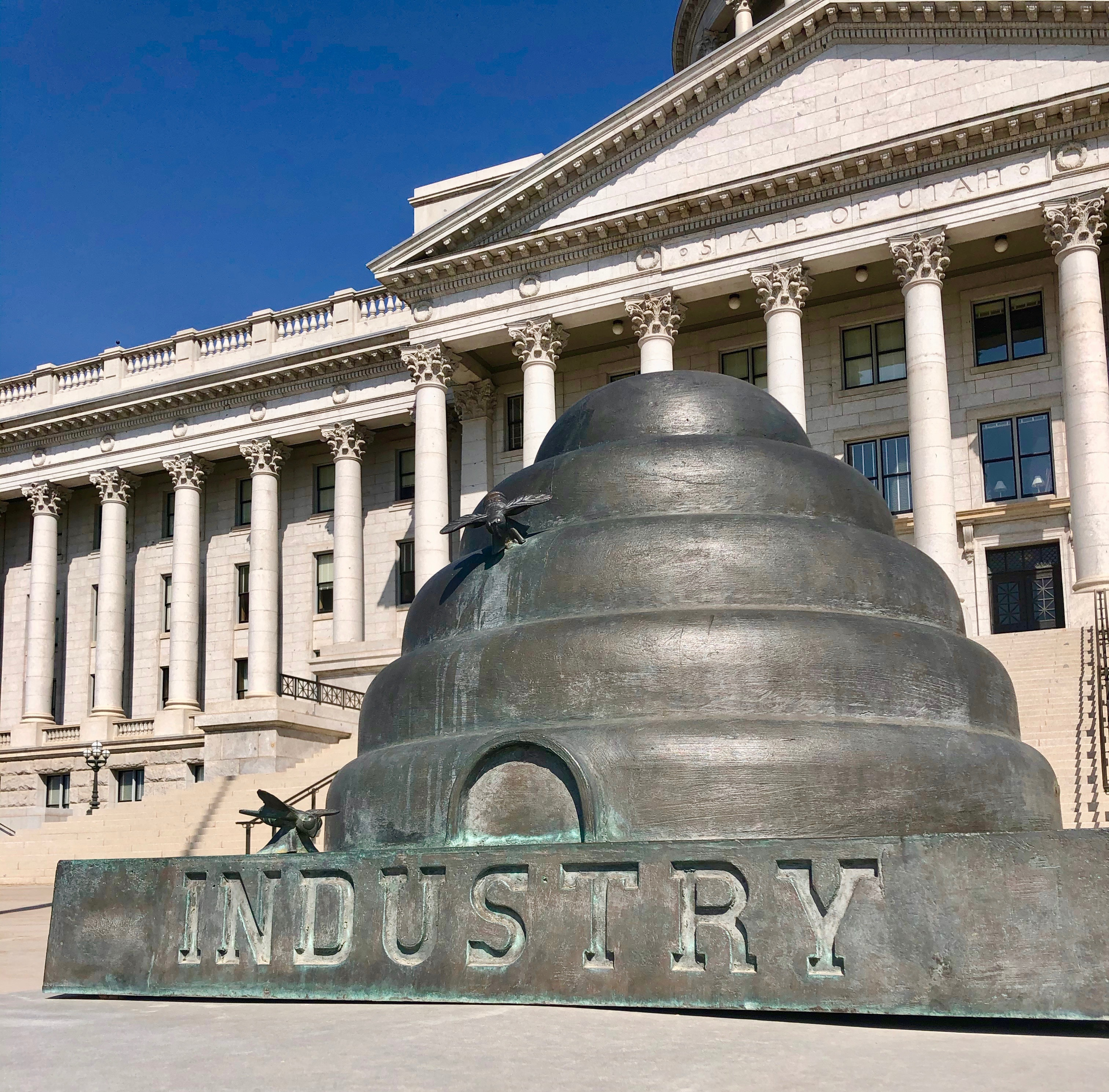
- Subject: Beehives
- Location: Salt Lake City, Utah, United States; 40°46′36.6″N 111°53′17.6″W

Two sculptures of beehives are installed outside the Utah State Capitol in Salt Lake City, Utah, United States. The artworks were presented to the state by the Kennecott Copper Corporation on July 24, 1976. They are located on the grand staircase on the south side of the Capitol. The sculptures also feature the word "Industry," the state's official motto since 1959. The beehive has a long association with the state and The Church of Jesus Christ of Latter-day Saints.

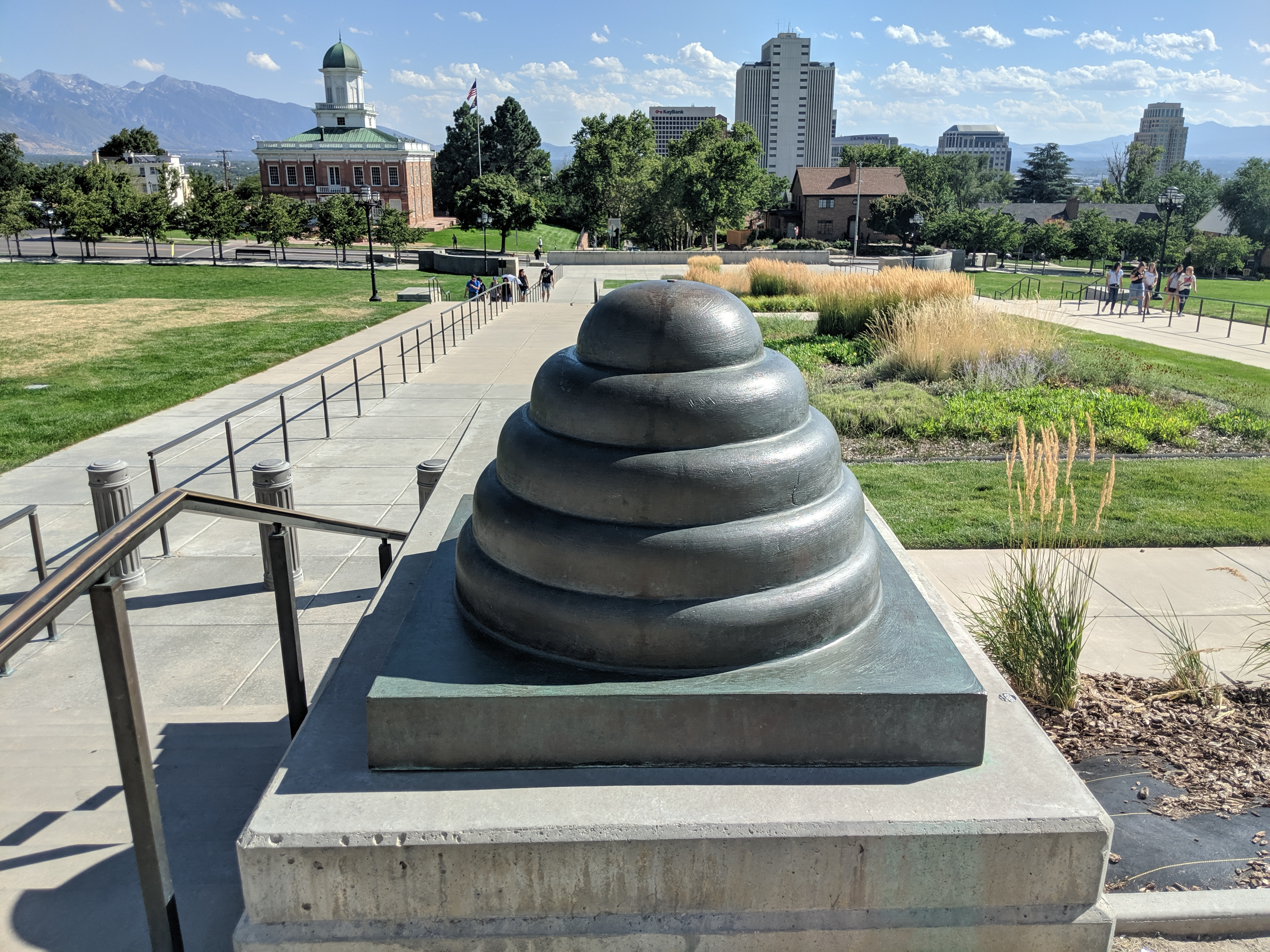
Sculpture

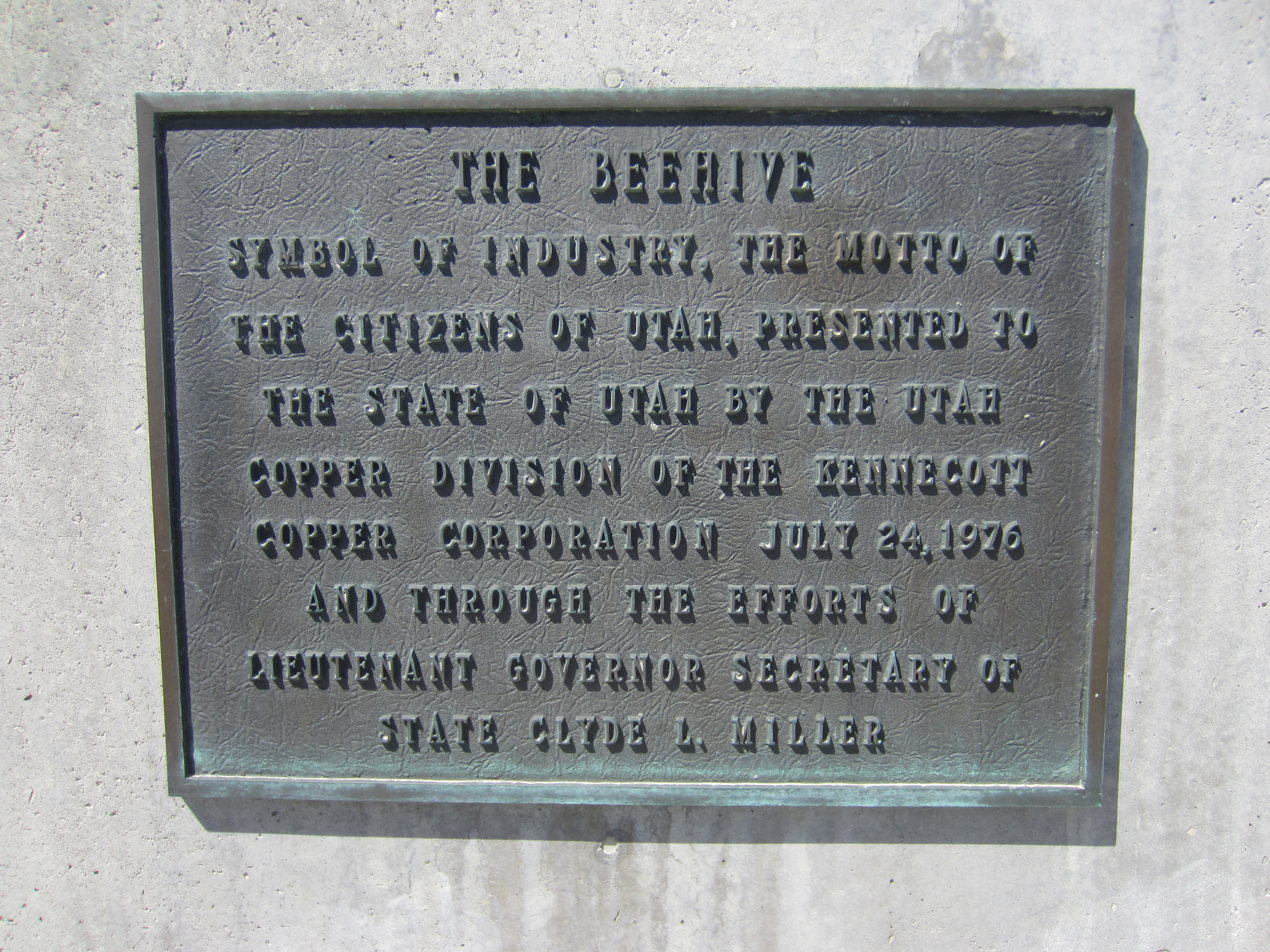
Plaque

== See also ==
- Insects in art
