= Counterpoint (sculpture) =

1979 sculpture by Dennis Smith in Salt Lake City, Utah, U.S.

- Artist: Dennis Smith
- Year: 1979
- Movement: Bronze sculpture
- Location: Salt Lake City, Utah, United States
- 40°45′53.3″N 111°53′35.3″W

Counterpoint is a 1979 bronze sculpture by Dennis Smith, installed in Salt Lake City, Utah, United States.

== Description and history ==
The artwork includes two figure groups, both of which measure approximately 12 by 5 by 2 feet (3.7 m × 1.5 m × 0.6 m) and rest concrete bases which measure approximately 5 by 1.5 by 1.5 feet (1.5 m × 0.5 m × 0.5 m). One statue depicts a man with a boy on his shoulders and the other depicts a woman swinging a girl around. The sculpture was surveyed by the Smithsonian Institution's "Save Outdoor Sculpture!" program in 1993.
