= Utah Women 2020 =

Mural in Salt Lake City, Utah, U.S.

- Location: Salt Lake City, Utah, United States
- 40.7668°N 111.8925°W

Utah Women 2020 is a mural in Salt Lake City, Utah, United States. The mural depicts more than 250 influential women.
