= Point of View (Stephan) =

Public artwork in Salt Lake City, Utah, U.S.

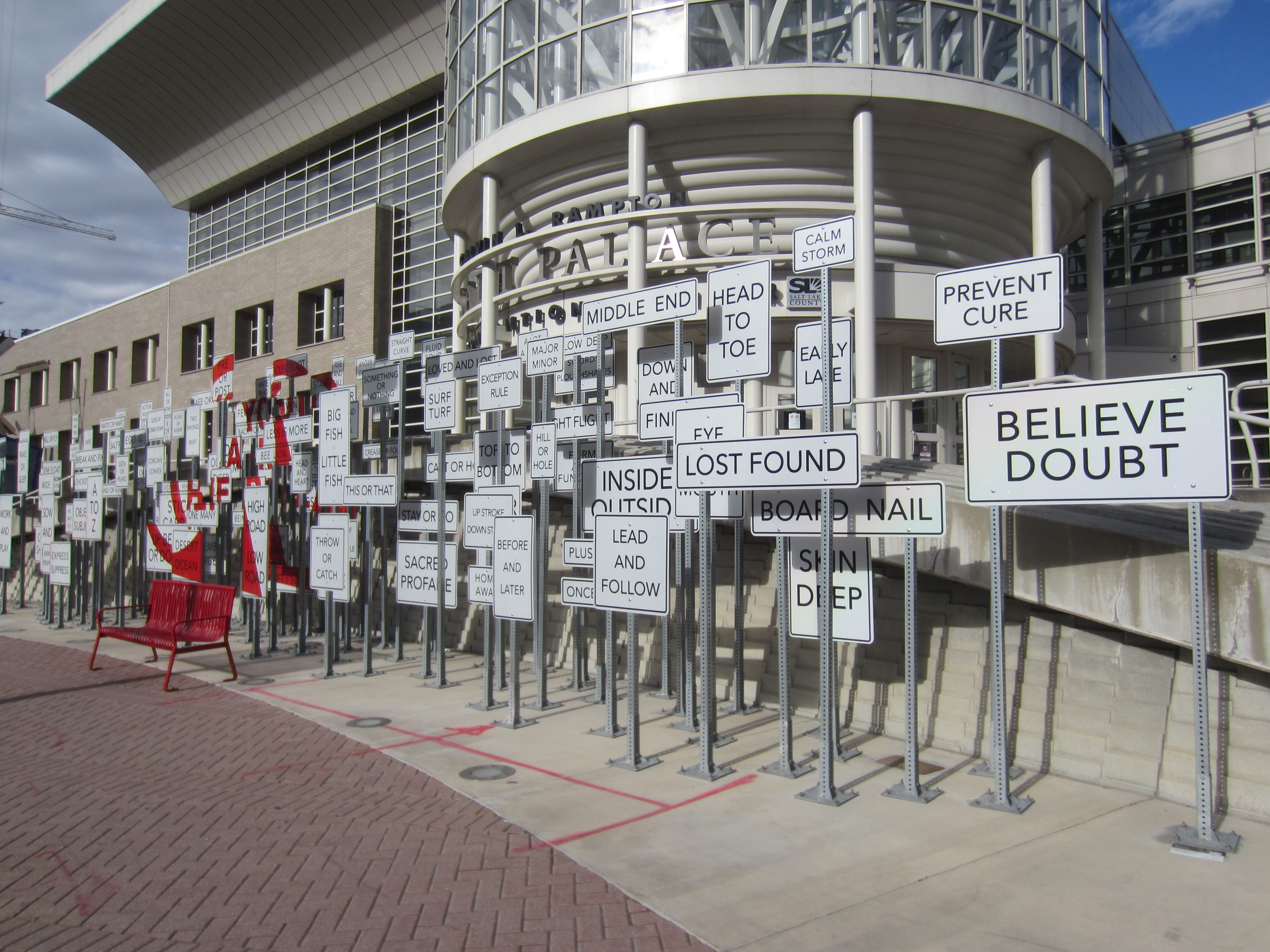
- The artwork in 2021
- Artist: Aaron T. Stephan
- Location: Salt Lake City, Utah, U.S.
- 40°46′1.9″N 111°53′39″W

Point of View is a public artwork by Aaron T. Stephan, installed outside Salt Lake City's Salt Palace (100 S. West Temple), in the U.S. state of Utah. The work was installed in 2016, and features approximately 150 signs displaying various phrases.

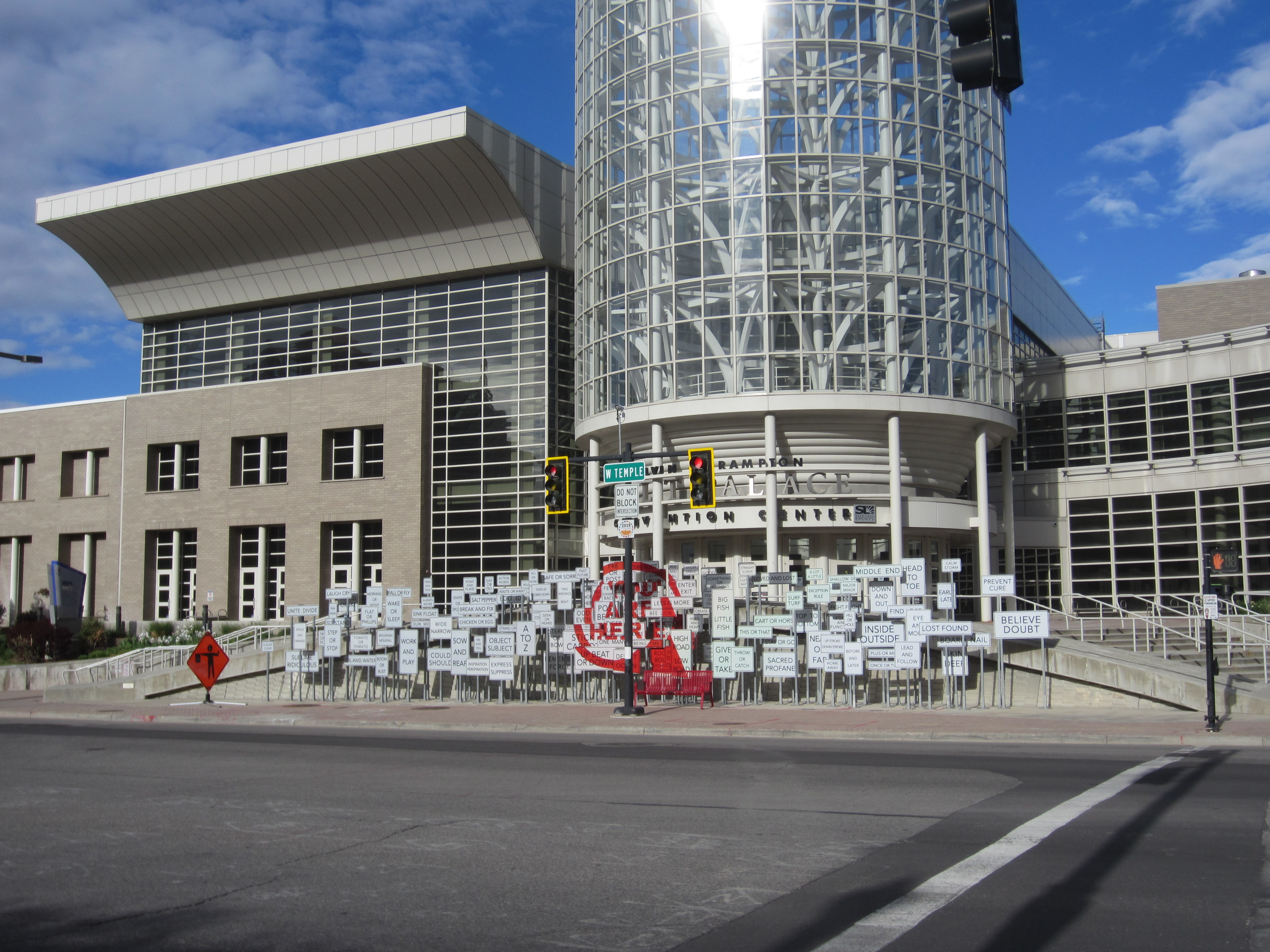

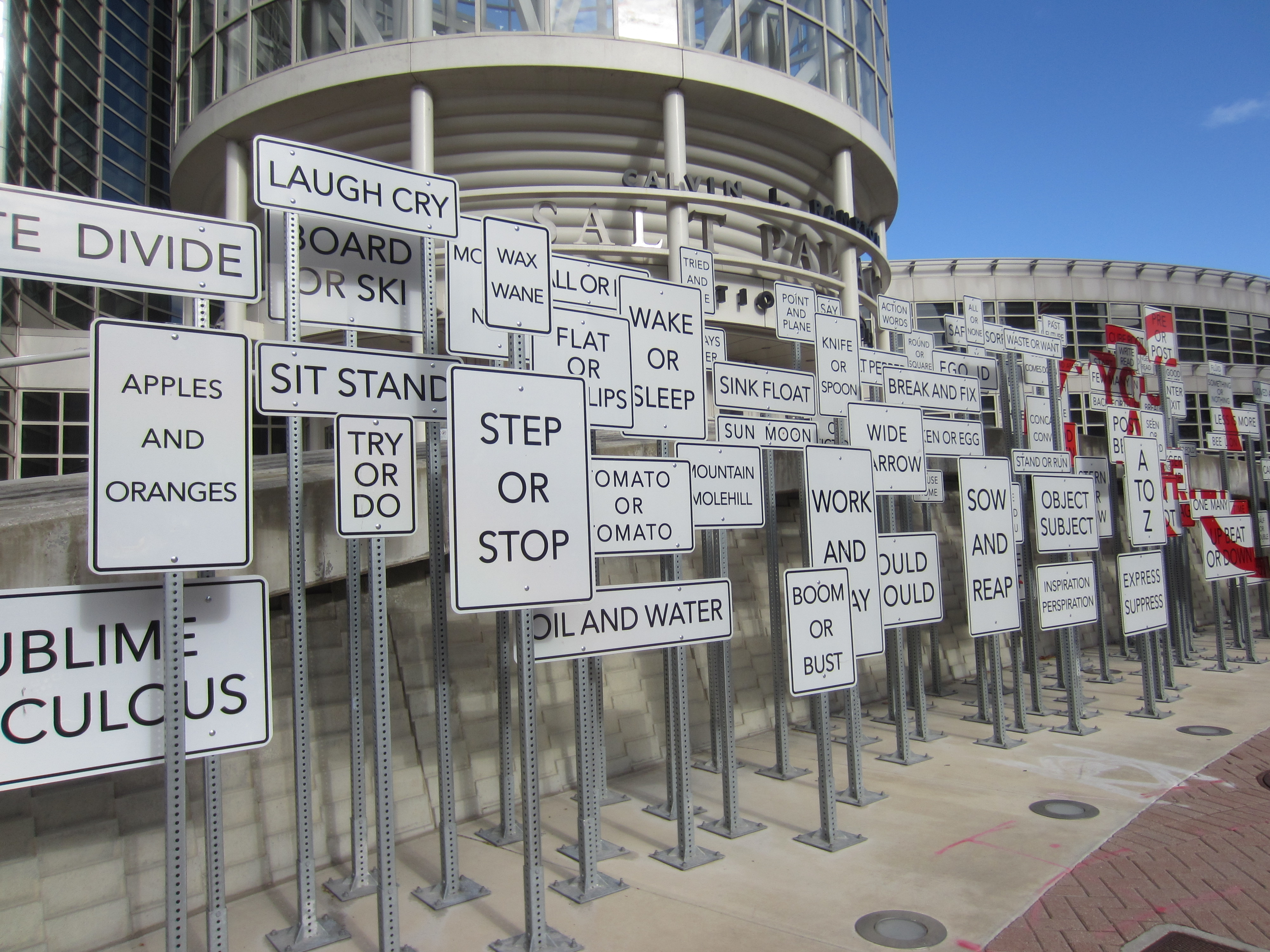

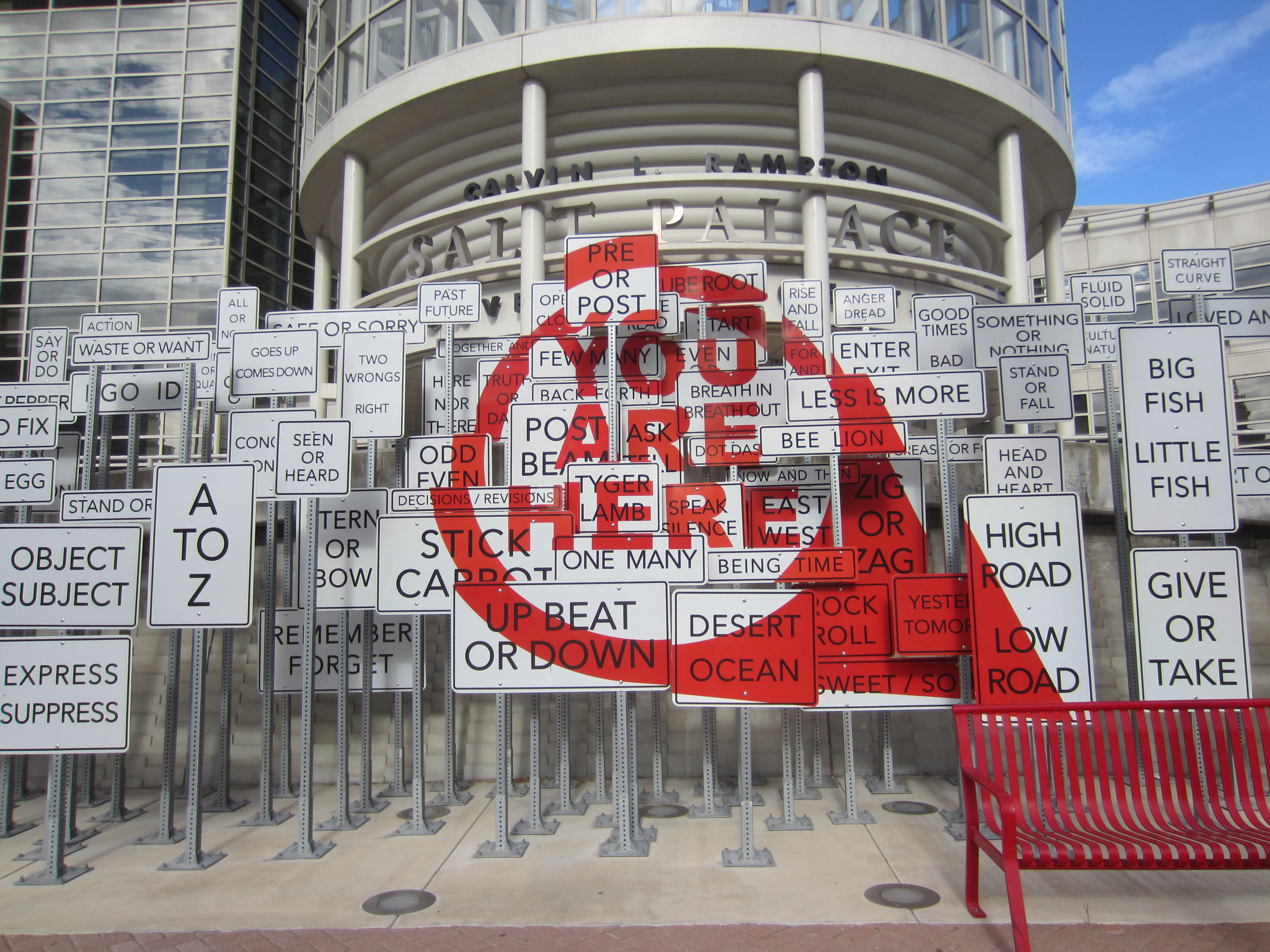
