= Statue of Vasilios Priskos =

Bronze sculpture in Salt Lake City, Utah, U.S.

- The statue in 2021
- Artist: Daniel Fairbanks
- Year: 2020
- Medium: Bronze
- Subject: Vasilios Priskos
- Location: Salt Lake City, Utah, United States; 40°45′57.9″N 111°53′27.4″W

An eight ft (2.4 m) bronze sculpture of Vasilios Priskos by Daniel Fairbanks is installed in Salt Lake City, Utah, United States.
