= Lupine Meadow Roll =

Sculpture by John B. Mortensen

- The sculpture in 2021
- Artist: John B. Mortensen
- Location: Salt Lake City, Utah, U.S.
- 40°46′10.9″N 111°54′0.5″W

Lupine Meadow Roll is a 1990 bronze sculpture by John B. Mortensen, installed in Salt Lake City's Triad Center in the U.S. state of Utah. The bear sculpture measures approximately 1 ft. x 8 in. x 2 ft. and rests on a concrete base which measures approximately 2 x 2 x 2 ft. According to the Smithsonian Institution, which surveyed the artwork as part of its "Save Outdoor Sculpture!" program in 1993, this cast is the ninth of twenty.
