= Puepahk Tugypahgyn Noomwevehchuh Psehdtuhneeyet =

Sculpture in Salt Lake City, Utah, U.S.

- Seasons of Our Story
- The sculpture in 2021
- Artist: Janet Shapero
- Year: 1993
- Location: Salt Lake City, Utah, United States
- 40°46′10.5″N 111°54′2.4″W

Puepahk Tugypahgyn Noomwevehchuh Psehdtuhneeyet (also known as Seasons of Our Story) is a 1993 glass and red sandstone sculpture by Janet Shapero, installed in Salt Lake City, Utah, United States.

== Description and history ==
Installed in the Triad Center, the abstract work was commissioned during 1992–1993, copyrighted in 1993, and dedicated on June 21 of that year. The central stone measures approximately 12 x 8 x 4 feet, and the glass prisms each weigh 400 pounds and measure approximately 6 feet x 18 inches x 6 inches. The artwork was surveyed by the Smithsonian Institution's "Save Outdoor Sculpture!" program in 1994.
