= Statues of Joseph and Hyrum Smith =

Statues in Salt Lake City, Utah, USA

- The Prophet and The Patriarch
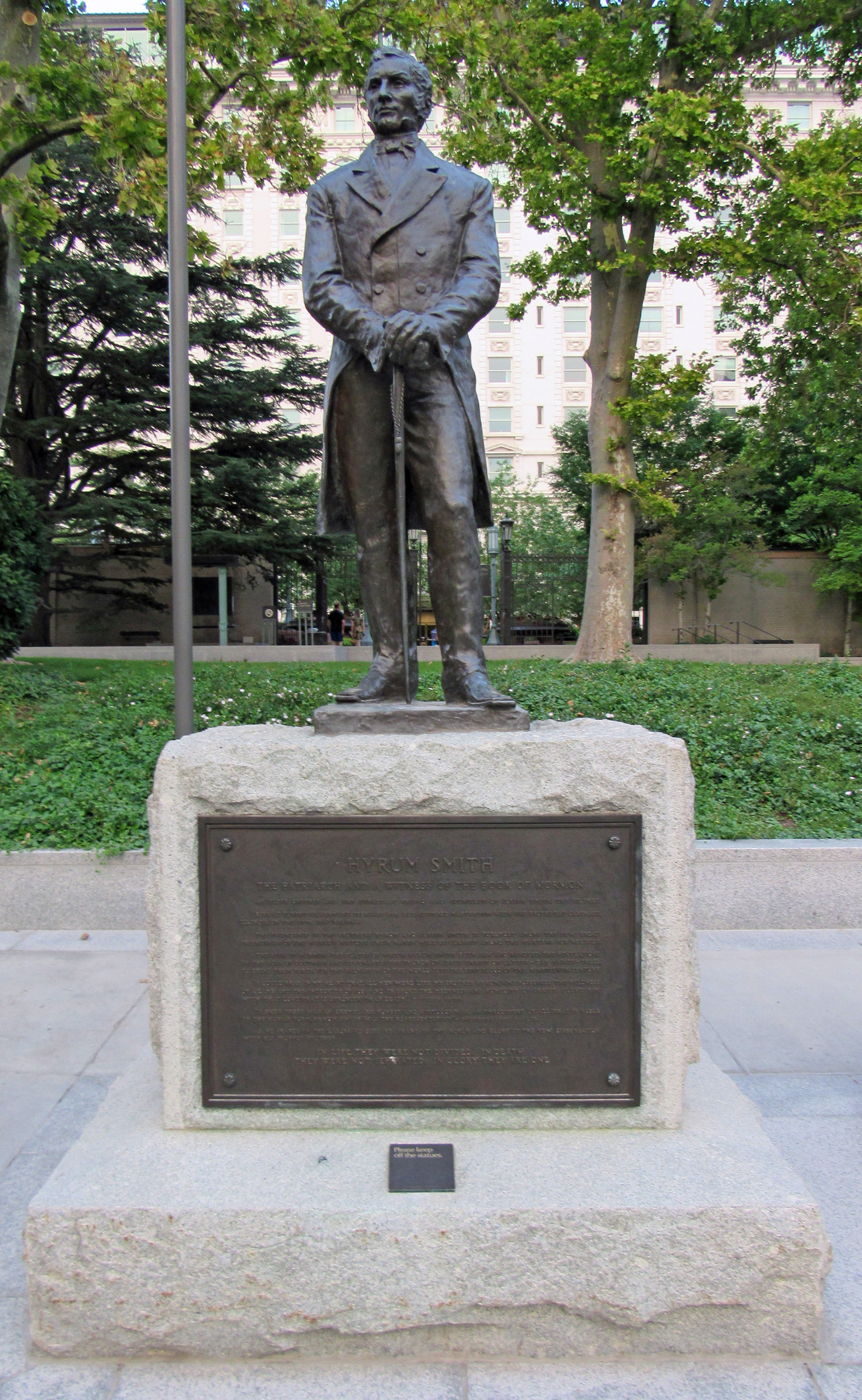
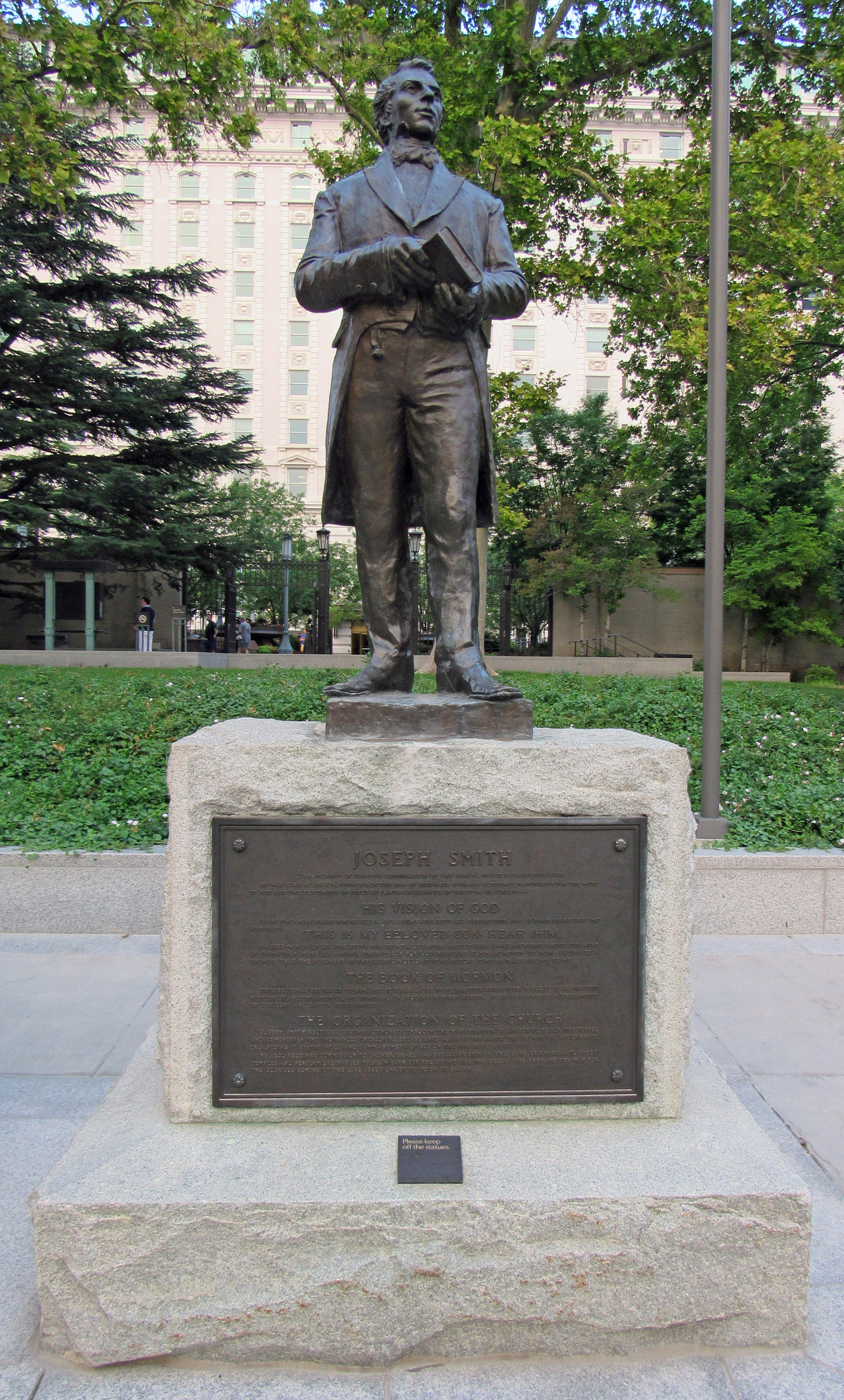
- Hyrum at left and Joseph at right, as they appeared on Temple Square in 2018
- Artist: Mahonri Young
- Year: 1907–1909
- Type: Sculpture
- Medium: Bronze
- Subject: Joseph Smith and Hyrum Smith
- Location: Salt Lake City, Utah, United States
- Owner: The Church of Jesus Christ of Latter-day Saints

Two statues of Joseph Smith and his brother Hyrum Smith are located on Temple Square in downtown Salt Lake City, Utah. Sometimes called The Prophet and The Patriarch, the two statues were created by Mahonri Young between 1907 and 1909.

Originally placed in niches next to the east doors of the Salt Lake Temple, they were shortly after moved to a landscaped area just south of the temple. Since that time, the statues have remained in this general area, with minor reconfigurations during building and landscaping projects on Temple Square.

== Description ==
The statues are of Joseph Smith, who was the founder and first Prophet/President of the Church of Jesus Christ of Latter-day Saints (LDS Church) and his brother, Hyrum, who was the church's Presiding Patriarch. They were both killed by a mob on June 27, 1844, after which the church's membership migrated to the Salt Lake Valley.

Both men are shown standing, with Joseph's hands extended in front of him, clasping a copy of the Book of Mormon. Hyrum's hands are crossed and rest on the head of a walking stick. The statues were created using the death masks of the two brothers along with an old painting which showed the profiles of both men, thus ensuring some degree of likeness. The statues were designed for the niches beside the east doors of the Salt Lake Temple, and each life-sized figure has their head slightly turned so as to formerly have looked at any person standing directly in front of the temple doors. When the statues were removed from the niches and placed on high granite pedestals, it changed the viewing angles and no longer showed the works at their best advantage or with their original intent.

== History ==
=== Creation ===
Following his artistic training, Mahonri Young returned to his native Salt Lake City and began to seek out work. Young approached leaders of the church about creating a life-sized statue of Joseph Smith, using Smith's death mask (which was in the possession of the church) to accurately model his facial features. However, at the time, leaders decided to only commission Young to create a bust of Smith, after which a decision on a full-sized statue would be made. The death mask was provided to Young in March 1906, and in short time, Young had completed the bust.

In 1907, the church commissioned Young to create the life-sized statue. As he began work on the project, he found several circumstances were affecting the quality. This included using his dining room as a studio, and the only clay, plaster and other necessary art equipment available in Utah was unsatisfactory. Once he completed the plaster model, it placed on display in the Bureau of Information on Temple Square. But ultimately this statue was rejected by church leadership, who would only have it bronzed if alterations were made. Instead, Young offered to create another statue of Smith at no cost, if the church would pay him to produce a companion piece of Smith's brother, Hyrum. The church agreed, although this time its leaders required close supervision while the two statues were sculpted. While creating the new statues, Young was provided with space in the Social Hall for a studio. The closeness of the Social Hall to church headquarters also allowed church leadership to easily supervise his work.

=== Placements ===
On November 5, 1909, the Deseret Evening News reported that the completed statues of Joseph and Hyrum Smith had been placed in niches next to the doors of the Salt Lake Temple. Joseph's statue was located next to the southeast door and the statue of Hyrum was placed next to the northeast door.

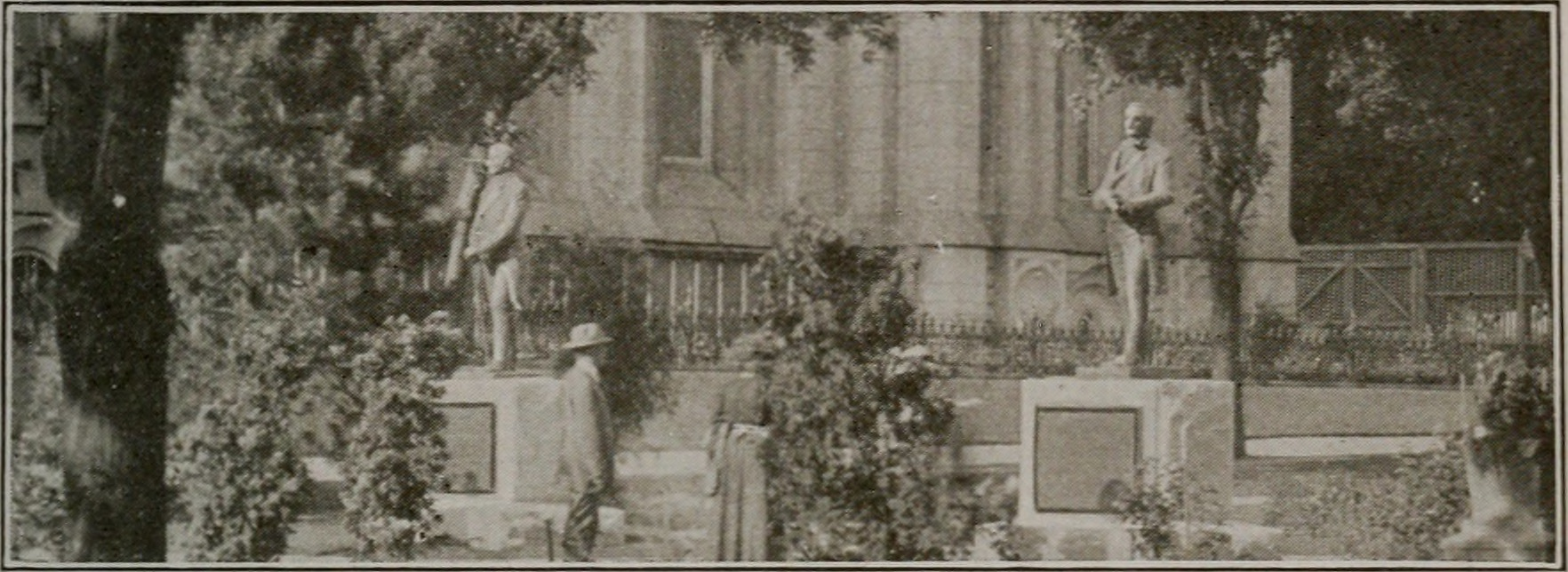
The statues in 1915

In May 1911, it was announced that the statues would be removed from the temple niches and instead would be moved to the grassy plot just south of the temple, an area where they would receive greater visibility. Here they were placed on large granite pedestals that had attached bronze tablets with inscriptions. The statues were in place at their new location by June 27, 1911. Originally an unveiling ceremony was supposed to be held that day, but the church's president, Joseph F. Smith, was away and the ceremony was indefinitely postponed.

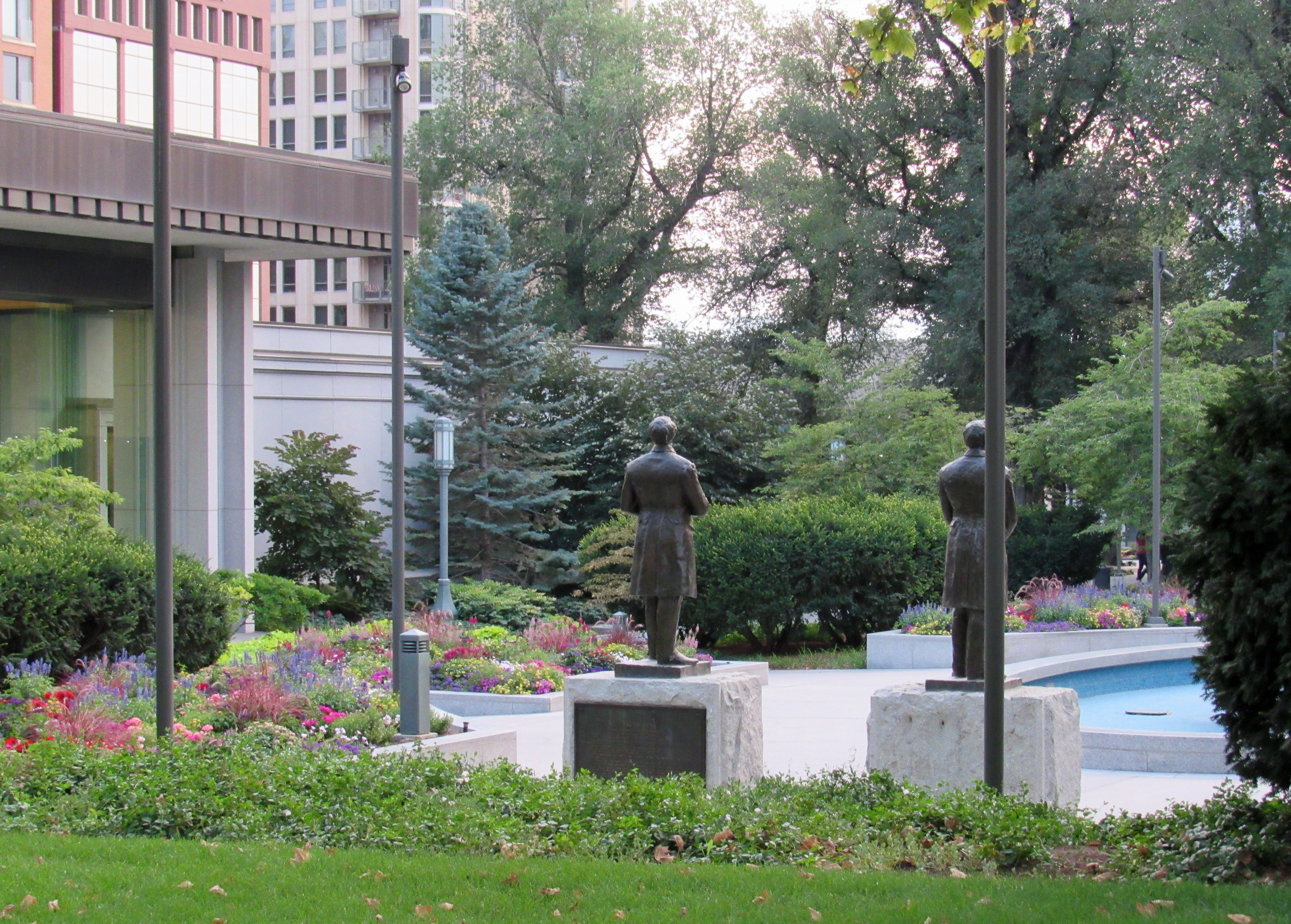
The statues as they were placed from 1977 to 2020

In the 1970s, the Bureau of Information on Temple Square was torn down and replaced with the South Visitors Center. Since 1911, the two statues of the Smith brothers had sat between the temple and the bureau building and their placement was slightly reconfigured during the construction of the new visitors center. A new area, called the Joseph Smith Memorial Garden, was developed between the temple and visitors center. The two statues were placed on the eastern side of the garden, looking across a plaza and fountain towards Avard Fairbanks' Three Witnesses monument, which was on the western side of the garden. Here the two statues remained until they were temporarily removed from Temple Square in 2020, to allow for the multi-year renovation project of the Salt Lake Temple and surrounding Temple Square.

== Copies ==
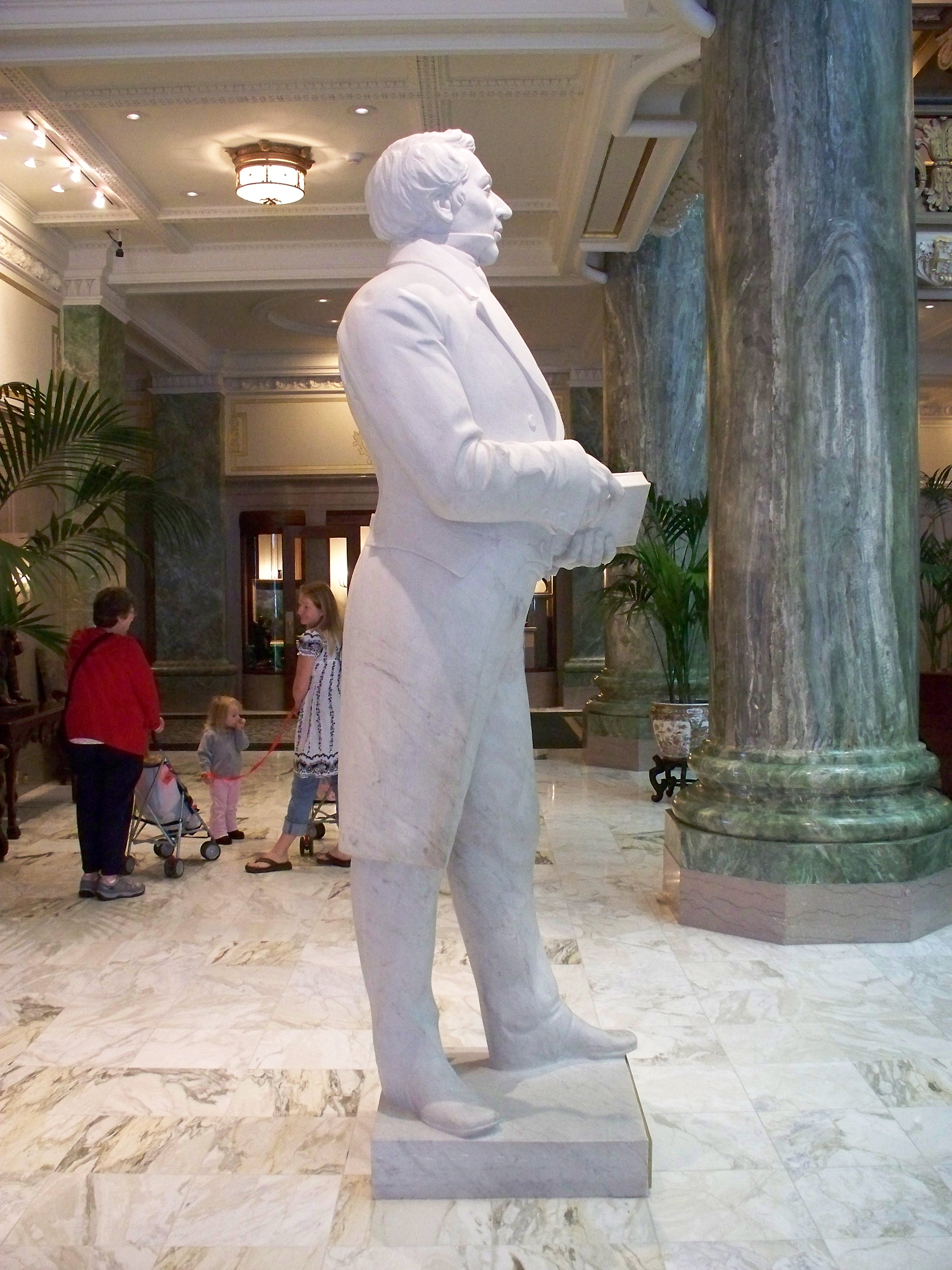
Heroic-sized copy in the Joseph Smith Memorial Building

Young's statue of Joseph Smith is an iconic image of the church founder and has been reproduced several times. In 1964, a plaster cast of the statue was used to create a fiberglass replica of the statue. The replica was then placed in the Mormon pavilion at the 1964 New York World's Fair. A few years later, a plaster model of the original statue was created and sent to Italy where artist Enzo Pasquini carved a full-sized, 1,800 pounds (820 kg) replica out of white Carrara marble. This replica was placed on display at the church's pavilion during HemisFair '68.

In June 1993, the church dedicated the renovated Hotel Utah as the Joseph Smith Memorial Building. During the building's conversion, a heroic-sized replica of the statue was placed in the lobby. This copy had originally been at the Independence Visitors' Center, but had gone into storage when that center's exhibits were changed. Made of Italian marble, this replica weighs 3,950 pounds (1,790 kg) and stands 9 feet 6 inches (2.90 m) tall.

== Bibliography ==
- Hinton, Wayne K. (Winter 1972). "Mahonri Young and the Church: A View of Mormonism and Art" (PDF). Dialogue: A Journal of Mormon Thought. 7 (4).
- Toone, Thomas E. (1997). Mahonri Young: His Life and Art. Salt Lake City: Signature Books. ISBN 1-56085-055-8.
