= Morgan Commercial and Normal College Marker =

Monument in Salt Lake City, Utah, U.S.

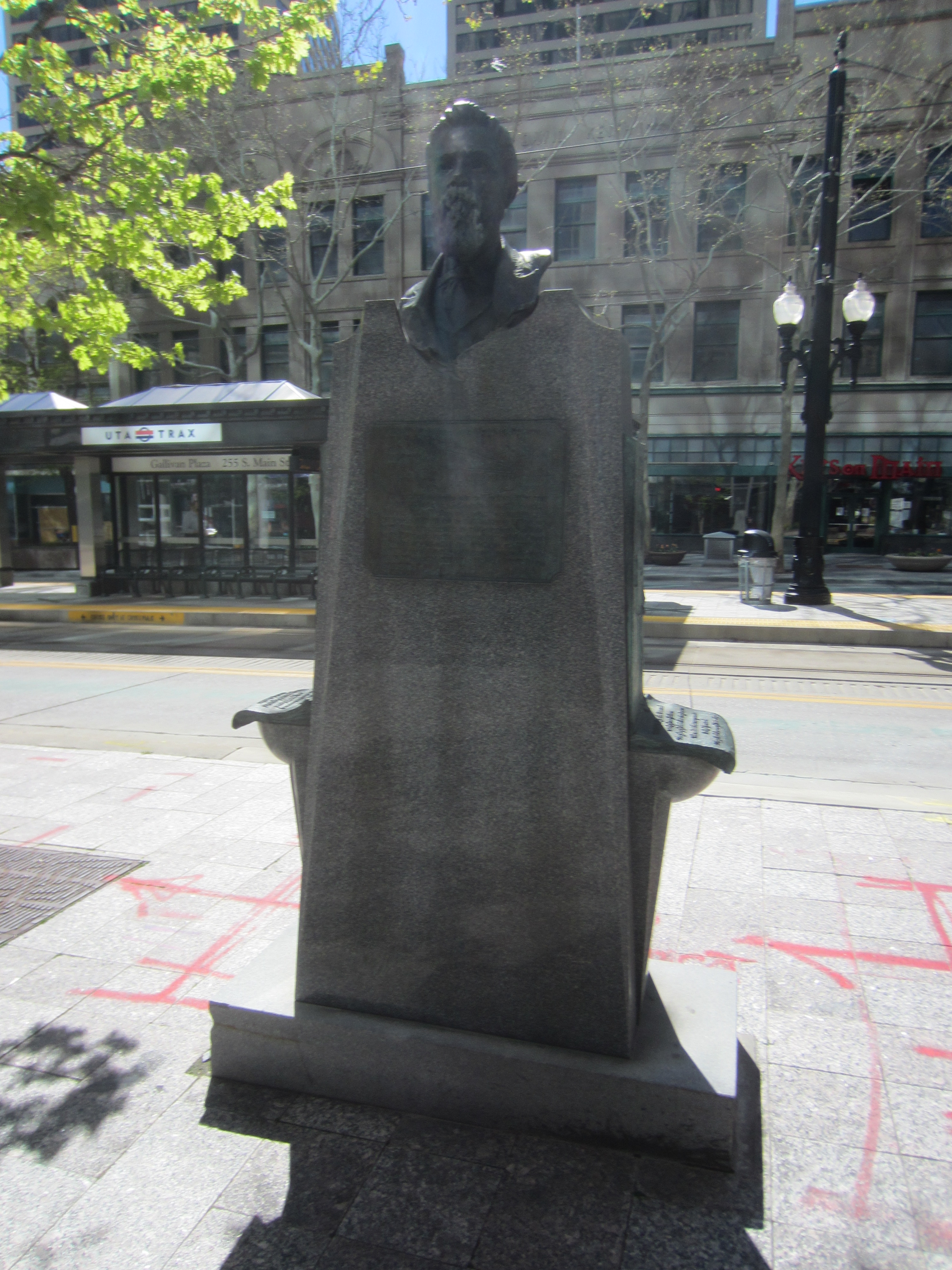
- The marker in 2021
- Location: Salt Lake City, Utah, U.S.
- 40°45′49.6″N 111°53′27.4″W

The Morgan Commercial and Normal College Marker is installed in Salt Lake City, in the U.S. state of Utah.

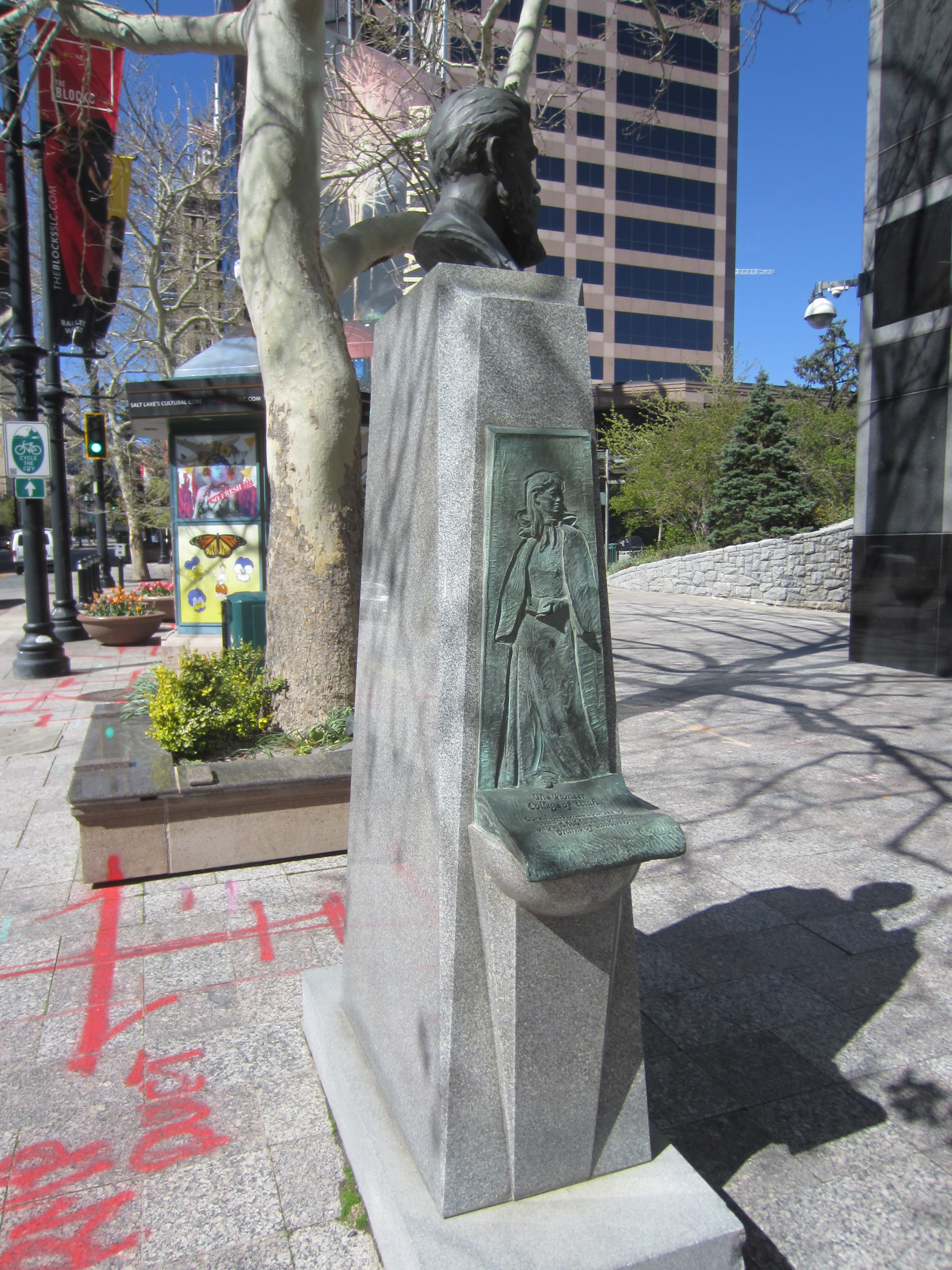
