= The Gateway (Salt Lake City) =

Shopping mall in Salt Lake City, Utah, U.S.

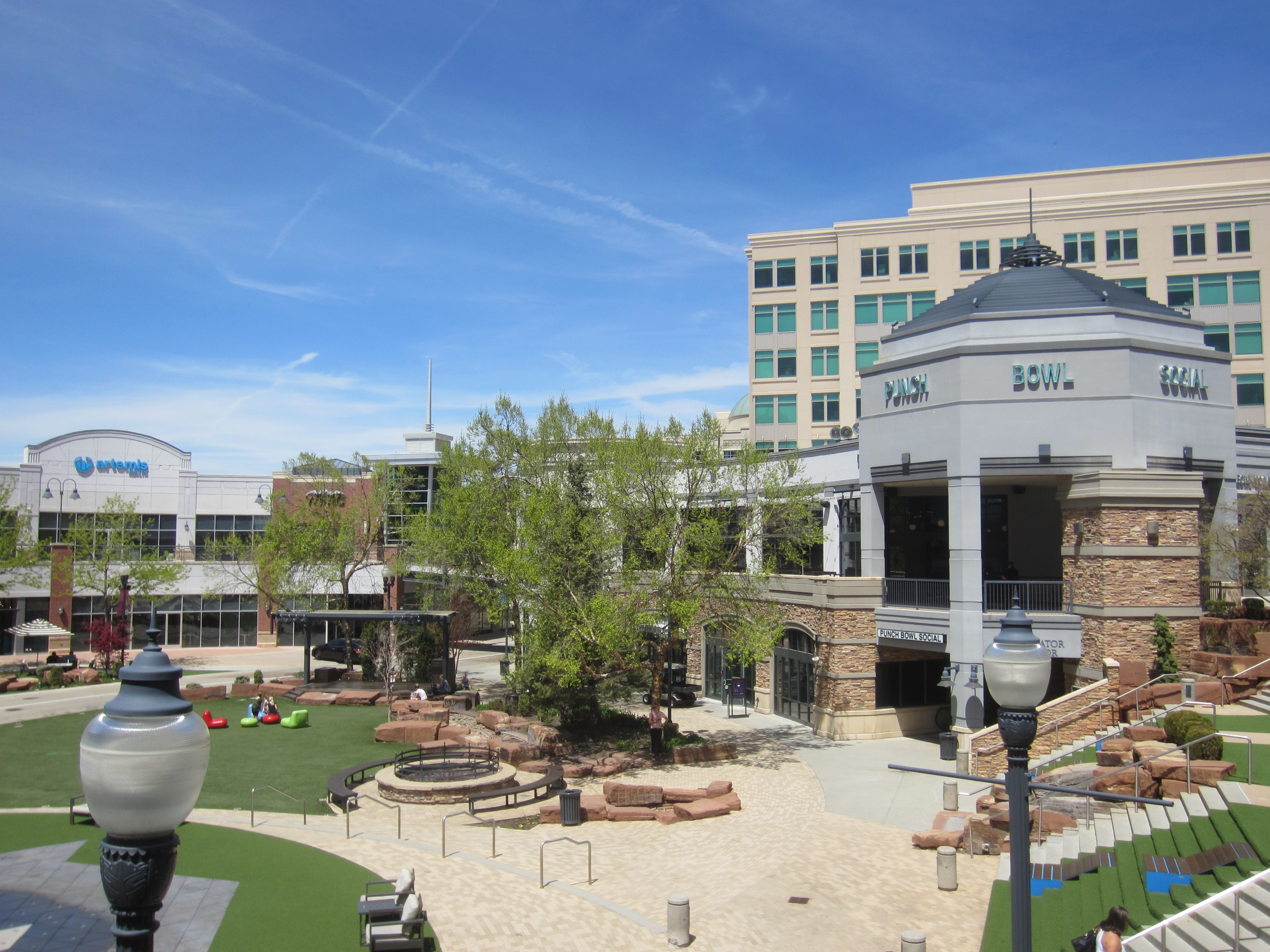
- The Gateway in 2021
- Location: Salt Lake City, Utah
- Coordinates: 40.7685°N 111.9038°W
- Opened: November 2001
- Developer: The Boyer Co.
- Owner: Vestar Development Co.
- Num. of stores: 105+
- Floor area: 650,000 SF
- Floors: 2
- Website: http://www.shopthegateway.com

The Gateway is a large, open-air retail, residential, and office complex in Salt Lake City, Utah, United States. It is centered on the historic Union Pacific Depot on the west side of Downtown Salt Lake City between 50 North and 200 South streets and between 400 and 500 West streets. Rio Grande Street has been the site of many special events and becomes a one-way street and heads north through the center. The center has featured as many as 89 outlets, but recent changes have allowed the center to provide new retail shopping experiences like and become more of a social gathering place centered on dining and nightlife.

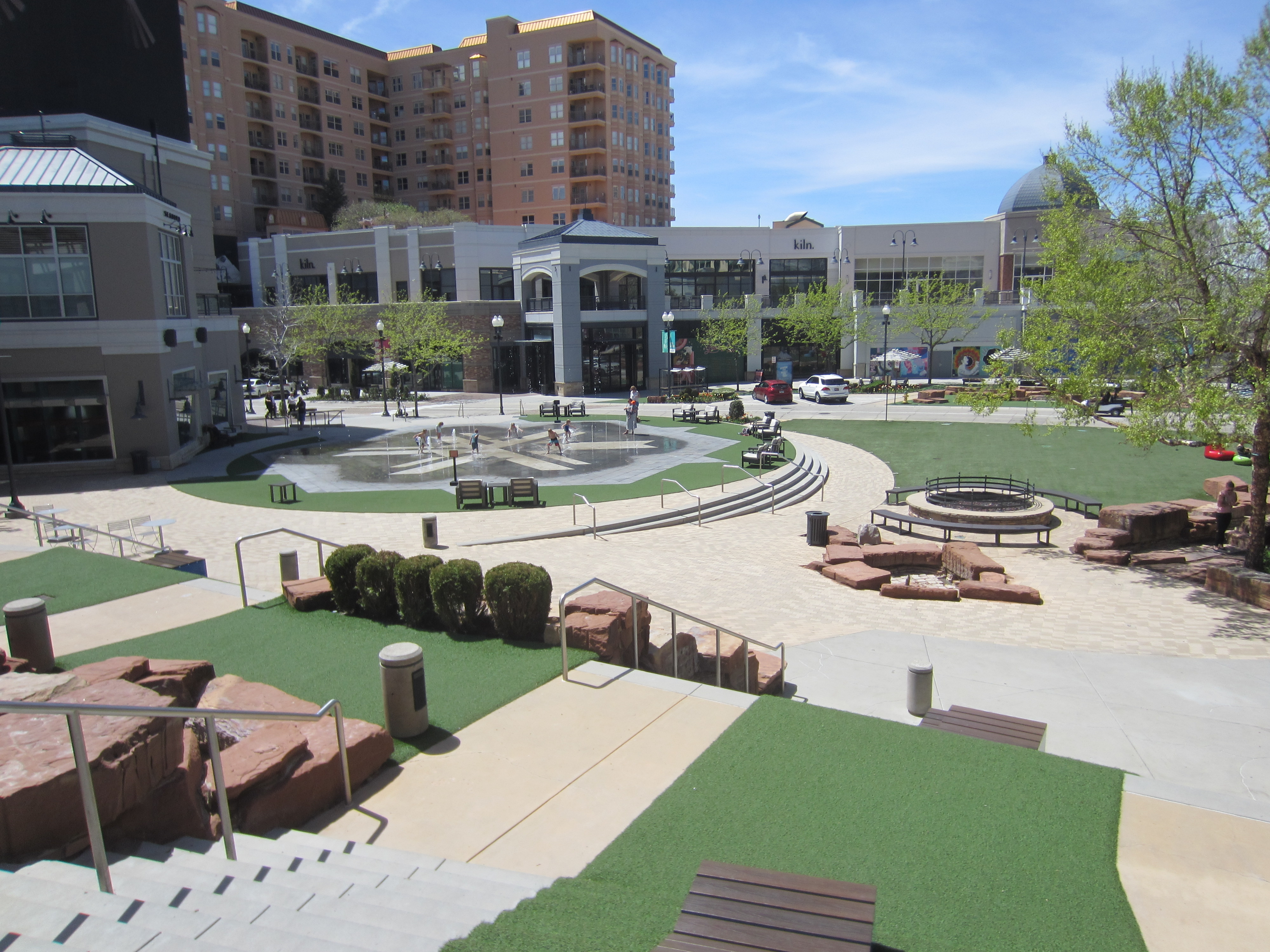
Olympic Legacy Plaza at The Gateway, 2021

In the northeast corner, a seven-story 230,000 sq ft (21,000 m^{2}) office tower for more than 1,200 employees was completed in 2007 for the sole occupancy of Fidelity Investments.

By 2014, the center's occupancy rate had fallen. Several major tenants such as Apple moved half a mile east to the newer and more centrally located City Creek Center, opened in 2012 by the Church of Jesus Christ of Latter-day Saints.

Retail Properties of America valued the center to $75 million in 2014 and projected further decline. Previous efforts to stabilize and sell the center failed. Some of the outdoor areas were upgraded, and nearby development projects were planned.

In February 2016, The Gateway was sold to the commercial real estate company Vestar. The company planned initially to renovate the center for $30 million. Ultimately, $100 million was invested by Vestar. Vestar restored the area's popularity and increased security, lowering crime by 79% and expecting crime to lower even further. The downtown shelter located on Rio Grande Street has also seen improvement because of the mall's new management.

The Megaplex Theatres at The Gateway served as a venue for the Sundance Film Festival in 2023.

In 2021, the W.O.S.B Collective (Women-Owned Small Business Collective) was founded at The Gateway. The boutique and gallery offers well sourced products, including clothing, swimwear accessories, gifts, and local art, and features items from global women-owned businesses.
