= Tribute to the Nation's Constitution and Flag =

Sculpture in Salt Lake City, Utah, U.S.

- School Children's Monument
- Artist: Torleif S. Knaphus
- Location: Salt Lake City, Utah, U.S.
- 40°45′34.5″N 111°53′16.6″W

Tribute to the Nation's Constitution and Flag, also known as the School Children's Monument, is a bronze sculpture by Torleif S. Knaphus, installed outside the Salt Lake City and County Building in the U.S. state of Utah.
