= Mormon Battalion Monument (Salt Lake City) =

Monument in Salt Lake City, Utah, U.S.

- United States
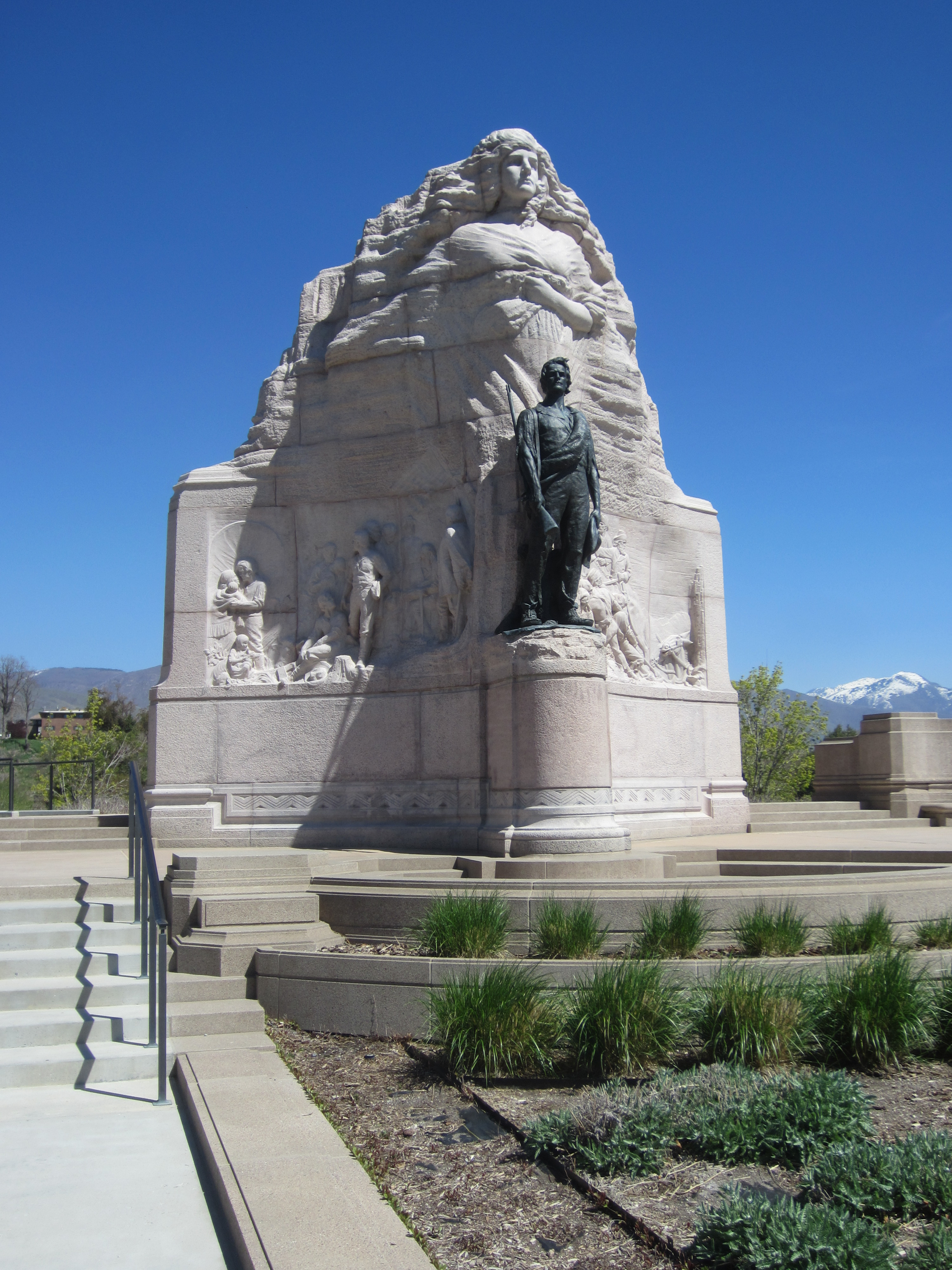
- The monument in 2021
- For Mormon Battalion
- Established: 1927
- Location: 40°46′35.4″N 111°53′13″W; Salt Lake City, Utah, U.S.
- Designed by: Gilbert Riswold

The Mormon Battalion Monument is installed outside the Utah State Capitol in Salt Lake City, in the U.S. state of Utah.

== Description and history ==
Dedicated in 1927, the 100-foot monument is made of rose pink granite and bronze and was sculpted by Gilbert Riswold.

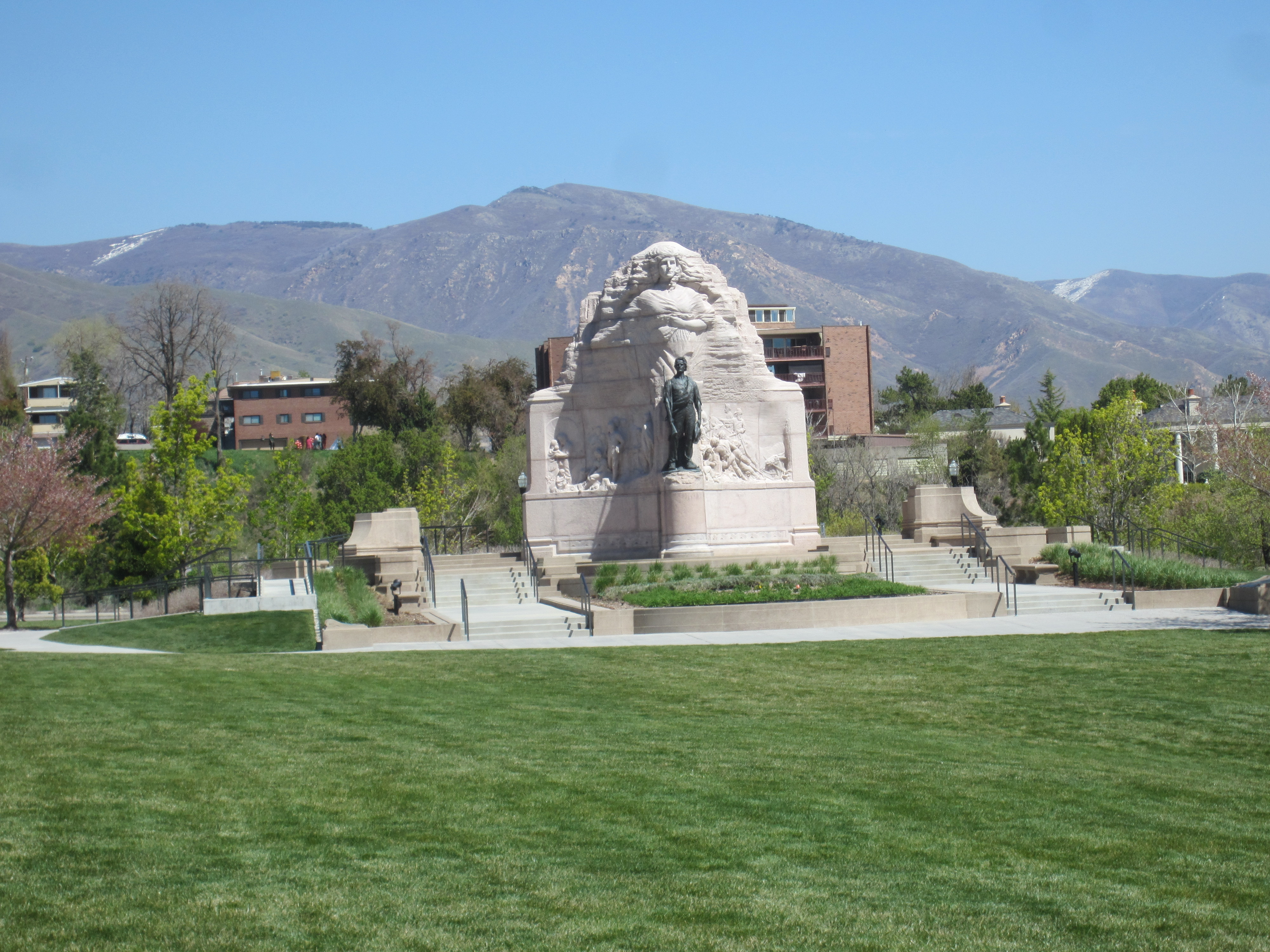
The monument in 2021

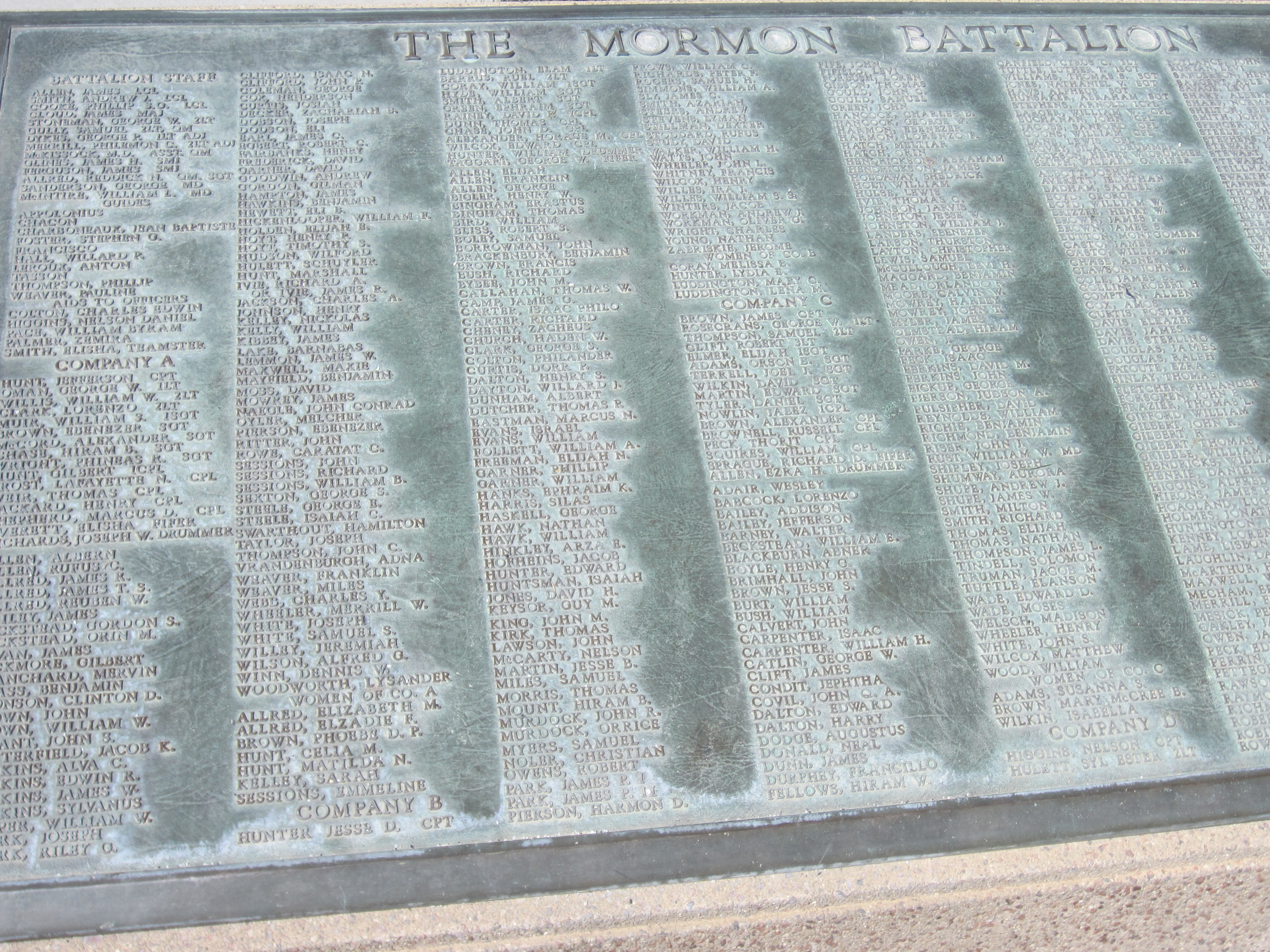
Plaque
