= Gilbert Riswold =

American sculptor

- Born: 1882; Minnehaha County, South Dakota, U.S.
- Died: 1938 (aged 55–56); Hollywood, Los Angeles, California, U.S.
- Education: South Dakota State University; School of the Art Institute of Chicago
- Occupation: Sculptor

Gilbert Riswold (1882–1938) was an American sculptor.

== Early life ==
Gilbert Riswold was born in 1882 in Minnehaha County, South Dakota, not far from Baltic. He graduated from South Dakota State University, and attended the School of the Art Institute of Chicago.

== Career ==
Riswold began his career as a sculptor in Chicago. He designed the statue of Stephen A. Douglas on the grounds of the Illinois State Capitol in Springfield, Illinois. He also designed a monument in Scoville Park in Oak Park, Illinois.

Riswold moved to Utah in 1926 to design the Mormon Battalion Monument on the grounds of the Utah State Capitol in Salt Lake City, Utah. By the 1930s, he worked as a sculptor in Los Angeles, California. He also designed sculptures in his home state of South Dakota.

== Death ==
Riswold died in 1938 in Los Angeles.

== See also ==
- Bust of Charles Roscoe Savage
