= An Urban Allegory (sculpture) =

Sculpture in Salt Lake City, Utah, U.S.

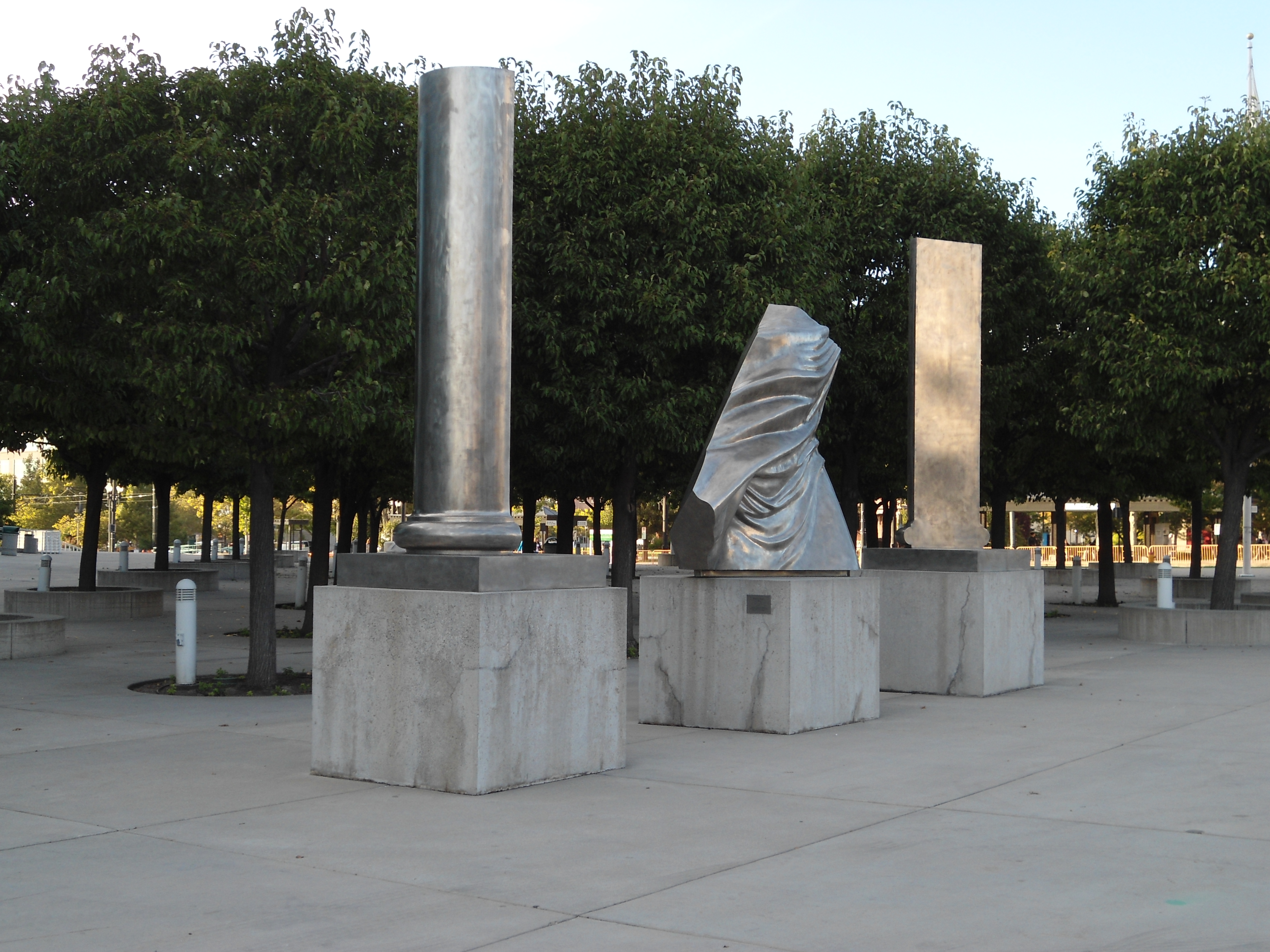
- The sculpture in 2011
- Artist: Neil Hadlock
- Year: 1992
- Medium: Steel sculpture
- Dimensions: 2.4 m × 1.2 m × 6.1 m (8 ft × 4 ft × 20 ft)
- Location: Salt Lake City, Utah, United States
- 40°46′8.7″N 111°54′3.1″W

An Urban Allegory is a 1992 steel sculpture by Neil Hadlock, installed in Salt Lake City, Utah, United States. The sculpture measures approximately 8 x 4 x 20 feet and rests on a concrete base which measures approximately 4 x 4 x 4 feet. It was dedicated in June 1992. The artwork was surveyed by the Smithsonian Institution's "Save Outdoor Sculpture!" program in 1993.

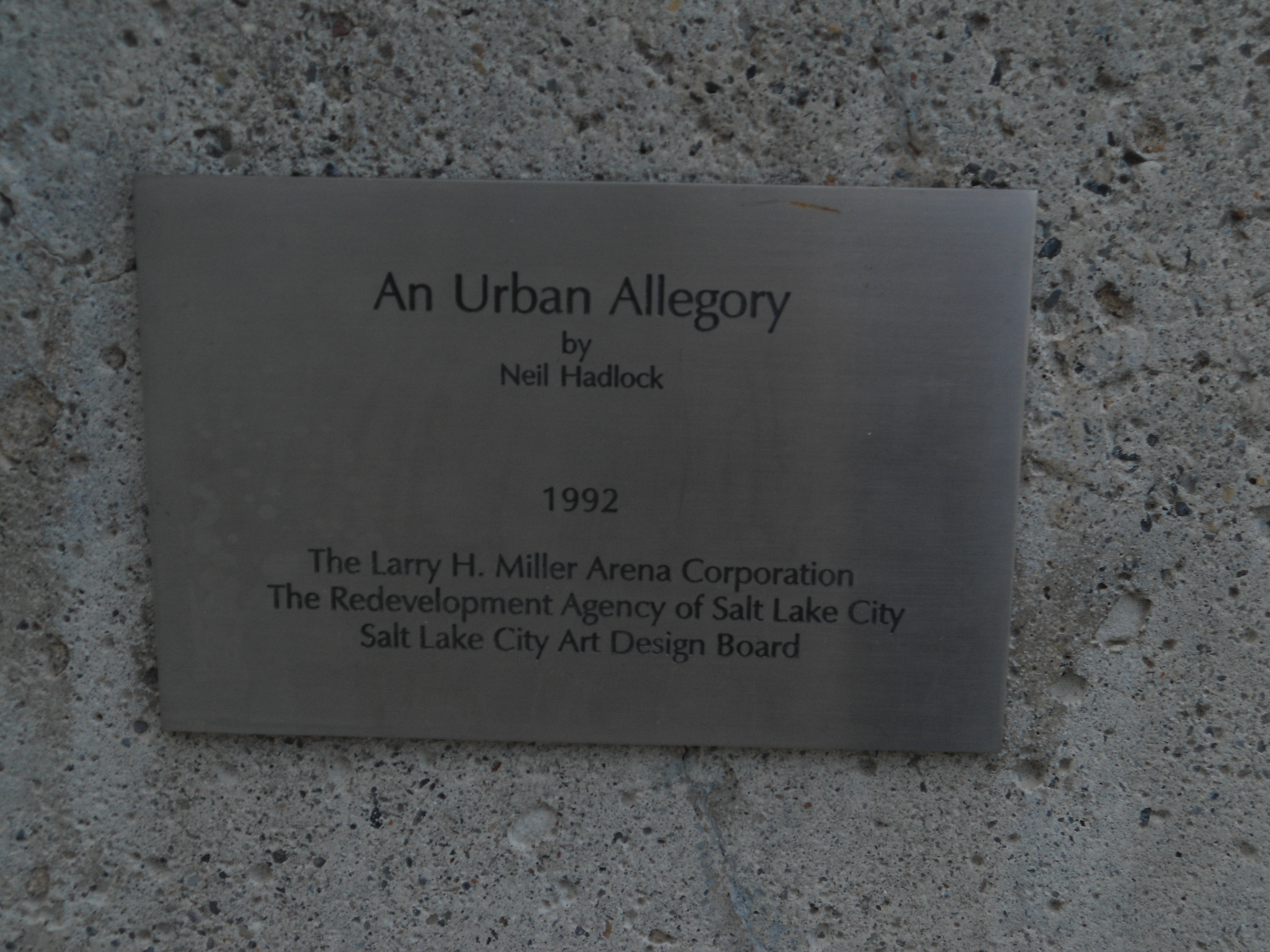
Plaque

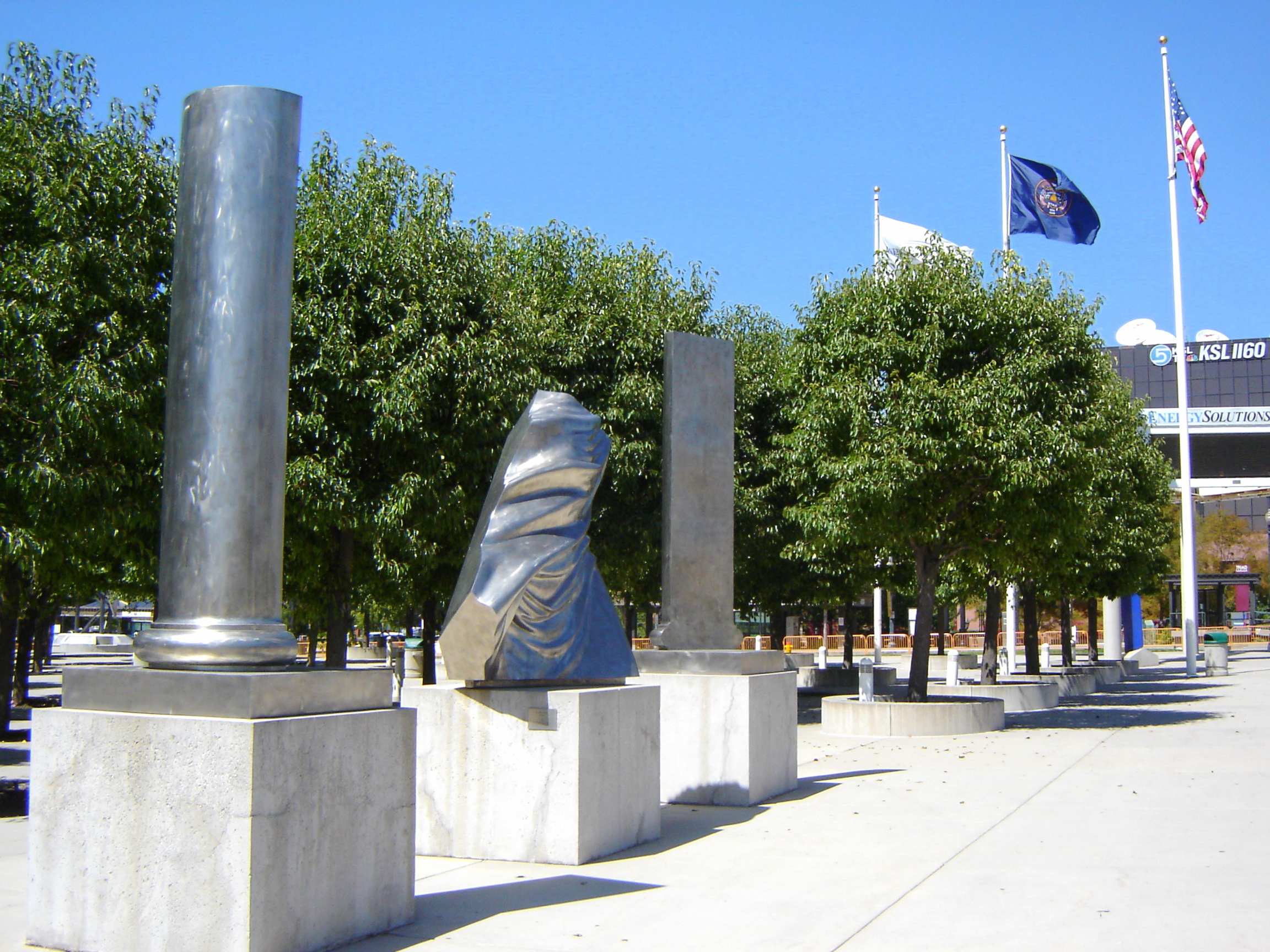
2009

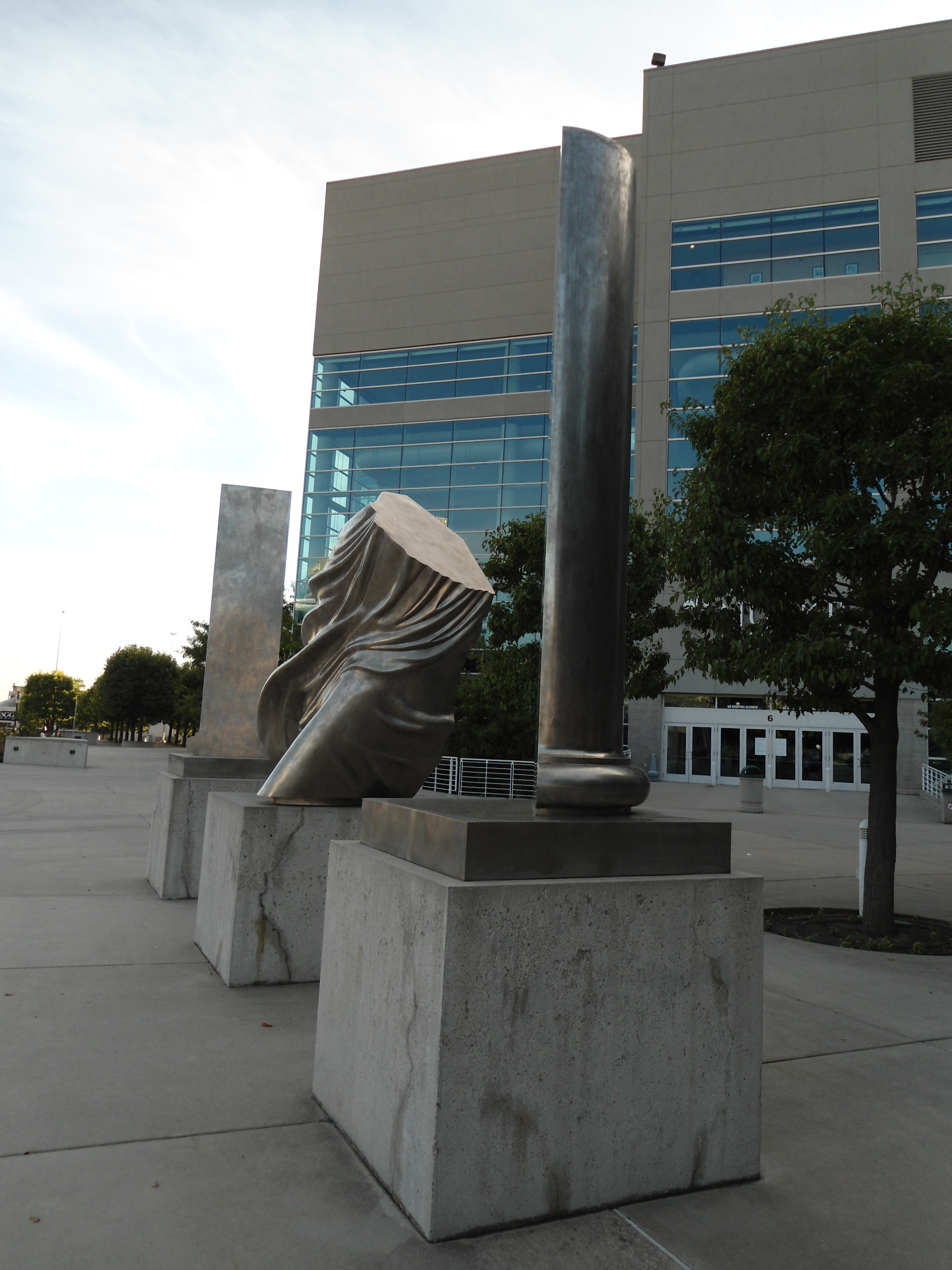
2011
