= Dennis Smith (sculptor) =

American sculptor (born 1942)

Dennis Von Smith
- Born: 1942 (age 83–84)
- Education: Royal Danish Academy of Fine Arts, Brigham Young University
- Known for: Sculpture
- Notable work: Monument to Women Memorial Garden (Nauvoo, Illinois), "Christina," "Signing of the Constitution," "In The Family Circle," and more

Dennis Von Smith (born 1942) is an American sculptor. He is a Latter-day Saint (LDS) and some of his artwork deals with LDS themes.

He is most noted in LDS circles for having created most of the statues that form the Monument to Women Memorial Garden in Nauvoo, Illinois.

== Biography ==

Smith was born in Alpine, Utah, in 1942 where he lived until 1961 when he left on a two-year LDS missionary in Denmark. He graduated from Brigham Young University in 1966. He was accepted into the Royal Danish Academy of Fine Arts and returned to Utah in 1968.

Smith began his art production in 1968, working in his father's chicken coop.

Smith created a sculpture named "Christina" that is named for his Danish immigrant great-grandmother and is in Copenhagen that portrays her having a strong faith. There is also a casting on "Christina" in the Statue Garden at Brigham Young University between the Museum of Art and the Harris Fine Arts Center.

Another one of his statues, this one in Rebild, Denmark represents an LDS emigrant family about to depart Denmark.

There are also works by Smith in the Salt Lake City International Airport and Primary Children's Medical Center.

In 1989, Smith's Signing of the Constitution sculpture was placed in US embassies in Moscow and London due to a donation of money from Richard Headlee.

Smith's In The Family Circle was given to Joan Bolger, wife of New Zealand's prime minister James Bolger by Richard G. Scott and other church representatives in 1996.

His studio and home are located in Alpine, Utah.

His First Step statue has also been presented to many dignitaries by the church, including president George H. W. Bush.
