= Oakland School =

Oakland School or Oaklands School may refer to:

== South Africa ==
- Oaklands Secondary School, in the Western Cape province of South Africa

== United Kingdom ==
- Oaklands School, a community secondary school located in Bethnal Green, London, England
- Oaklands Community School, a mixed comprehensive school in west Southampton, Hampshire, England
- Danegrove Primary School, formerly called Oakland School, a primary school in East Barnet, London, England

== United States ==
=== California ===
- Oakland Technical High School, Oakland Tech, or just simply "Tech", is a public high school in Oakland, California
- Oakland School for the Arts, a charter school in Oakland, California
- Oakland Unified School District, a public education school district in Oakland, California

=== Elsewhere ===
- Oaklands Catholic School, a Catholic voluntary (Aided) comprehensive coeducational school, Waterlooville, Hampshire
- Oakland Mills High School, Columbia, Maryland
- Oakland Christian School, a private pre-kindergarten–12 school in Auburn Hills, Michigan
- Oakland Public Schools, a comprehensive community public school district, Bergen County, New Jersey
- Oakland Catholic High School, a private, Roman Catholic college preparatory girls school, Pittsburgh, Pennsylvania
- Oakland School (Virginia), a coeducational boarding and day school in Keswick, Virginia
- Oakland Alternative High School, an alternative secondary school in Tacoma, Washington

== See also ==
- Oakland High School (disambiguation)
- Oakland (disambiguation)
- Oaklands (disambiguation)
