= Oakland (disambiguation) =

Oakland is a city in California, United States.

Oakland may also refer to:

== Places ==
=== Canada ===
- Rural Municipality of Oakland, Manitoba
- Oakland, Nova Scotia
- Oakland Township, Ontario, a historical township in the County of Brant
- Oakland, Essex County, Ontario

=== United States ===
==== Alabama ====
- Oakland, Chambers County, Alabama
- Oakland, Lauderdale County, Alabama
- Oakland, Limestone County, Alabama, near Athens
- Oakland (near Madison), Limestone County, Alabama

==== California ====
- East Oakland, Oakland, California, an area of the above mentioned city

==== Florida ====
- Oakland, Florida
- Oakland, one of the neighborhoods of Jacksonville
- Oakland, a historically African American neighborhood in Haines City, Florida

==== Georgia ====
- Oakland, Atlanta, a neighborhood

==== Illinois ====
- Oakland, Chicago
- Oakland, Illinois, in Coles County
  - East Oakland Township, Coles County, Illinois, includes the city
- Oakland Township, Schuyler County, Illinois

==== Indiana ====
- Oakland City, Indiana

==== Iowa ====
- Oakland, Iowa
- Oakfield Township, Audubon County, Iowa
- Oakland Township, Franklin County, Iowa
- Oakland Township, Louisa County, Iowa

==== Kansas ====
- Oakland Township, Clay County, Kansas
- Oakland Township, Cloud County, Kansas

==== Kentucky ====
- Oakland, Kentucky
- Oakland, Bracken County, Kentucky

==== Louisiana ====
- Oakland, Union Parish, Louisiana, a settlement

==== Maine ====
- Oakland, Maine, a town
  - Oakland (CDP), Maine, the primary village in the town

==== Maryland ====
- Oakland, Maryland, a town in Garrett County
- Oakland, Caroline County, Maryland

==== Massachusetts ====
- Oakland, Massachusetts

==== Michigan ====
- Oakland Charter Township, Michigan
- Oakland County, Michigan

==== Minnesota ====
- Oakland, Minnesota, an unincorporated community
- Oakland Township, Freeborn County, Minnesota
- Oakland Township, Mahnomen County, Minnesota

==== Mississippi ====
- Oakland, Mississippi

==== Missouri ====
- Oakland, Missouri, in St. Louis County
- Oakland, Laclede County, Missouri

==== Nebraska ====
- Oakland, Nebraska, a city in Burt County
- Oakland Township, Burt County, Nebraska

==== New Jersey ====
- Oakland, New Jersey, a borough in Bergen County
- Oakland, Salem County, New Jersey

==== North Carolina ====
- Oakland Township, Chatham County, North Carolina, Chatham County, North Carolina

==== North Dakota ====
- Oakland Township, Mountrail County, North Dakota, Mountrail County, North Dakota

==== Oklahoma ====
- Oakland, Oklahoma
- Fort Oakland, a defunct post-Civil War fort at the site of present-day Tonkawa

==== Oregon ====
- Oakland, Oregon

==== Pennsylvania ====
- Oakland (Pittsburgh)
- Oakland, Lawrence County, Pennsylvania
- Oakland, Susquehanna County, Pennsylvania
- Oakland Township, Butler County, Pennsylvania
- Oakland Township, Susquehanna County, Pennsylvania
- Oakland Township, Venango County, Pennsylvania

==== Rhode Island ====
- Oakland, Rhode Island
- Oakland Beach, Rhode Island

==== South Carolina ====
- Oakland, South Carolina

==== Tennessee ====
- Oakland, Tennessee

==== Texas ====
- Oakland, Cherokee County, Texas
- Oakland, Colorado County, Texas

==== Washington ====
- Oakland, Washington, an unincorporated community

==== Wisconsin ====
- Oakland, Burnett County, Wisconsin, a town
- Oakland (community), Burnett County, Wisconsin, an unincorporated community
- Oakland, Douglas County, Wisconsin, a town
- Oakland, Jefferson County, Wisconsin, a town
- Oakland (community), Jefferson County, Wisconsin, an unincorporated community

==== Historic buildings and plantations ====
- Oakland (Warm Springs, Georgia), aregistered historic place
- Oakland (Bryantown, Maryland)
- Oakland (9 Oakhurst Drive, Natchez, Mississippi)
- Oakland (Lower Woodville Road, Natchez, Mississippi), aregistered historic place
- Oakland (Airlie, North Carolina)
- Oakland (Dresden, Tennessee), aformer registered historic place
- Oakland (Gallatin, Tennessee)
- Oakland (Montpelier, Virginia)
- Oakland (Parkersburg, West Virginia)
- Oakland Plantation (disambiguation)

==== Multiple states ====
- Oakland Cemetery (disambiguation)
- Oakland Historic District (disambiguation)

== Schools ==
- Oakland University, Oakland County, Michigan
- Oakland City University, Oakland City, Indiana
- Oakland Community College, Oakland County, Michigan
- Oakland School (disambiguation)

== Sports teams ==
- Oakland Athletics, a Major League Baseball team in California
- Oakland Raiders, a former National Football League team in California
- Oakland Golden Grizzlies, the intercollegiate athletic program of Oakland University in Michigan
- Oakland Roots SC, a soccer team in California

== People ==
- Dagmar Oakland (1893–1989), American actress
- Ethelmary Oakland (1909–1999), American silent film child star
- Simon Oakland (1915–1983), American actor
- Thomas Oakland (1939–2015), American school psychologist

== Other uses ==
- Oakland Motor Car Company, an American car manufacturer later renamed to Pontiac
- USS Oakland (CL-95), a warship of the U.S. Navy

== See also ==
- Oaklands (disambiguation)
- Auckland, the largest city in New Zealand
- Auckland (disambiguation)
- "Telegraph Ave. ('Oakland' by Lloyd)", a 2013 song from Because the Internet by Childish Gambino
