= Oakland Township, Minnesota =

Oakland Township is the name of some places in the U.S. state of Minnesota:

- Oakland Township, Freeborn County, Minnesota
- Oakland Township, Mahnomen County, Minnesota

== See also ==
- Oakland Township (disambiguation)
