= Restoration of the Aaronic priesthood =

Restoration of the Aaronic priesthood may refer to:

- Restoration of the Aaronic priesthood, an 1829 event in which Joseph Smith claimed to receive God's power and authority
- Restoration of the Aaronic Priesthood, a 1957 sculpture by Avard Fairbanks
