= Oakland Township =

Oakland Township may refer to:

== Canada ==
- Oakland Township, Ontario, now part of Brant

== United States ==
=== Illinois ===
- Oakland Township, Schuyler County, Illinois

=== Iowa ===
- Oakfield Township, Audubon County, Iowa
- Oakland Township, Franklin County, Iowa
- Oakland Township, Louisa County, Iowa

=== Kansas ===
- Oakland Township, Clay County, Kansas
- Oakland Township, Cloud County, Kansas

=== Michigan ===
- Oakland Charter Township, Michigan

=== Minnesota ===
- Oakland Township, Freeborn County, Minnesota
- Oakland Township, Mahnomen County, Minnesota

=== Nebraska ===
- Oakland Township, Burt County, Nebraska

=== North Carolina ===
- Oakland Township, Chatham County, North Carolina, in Chatham County, North Carolina

=== North Dakota ===
- Oakland Township, Mountrail County, North Dakota, in Mountrail County, North Dakota

=== Pennsylvania ===
- Oakland Township, Butler County, Pennsylvania
- Oakland Township, Susquehanna County, Pennsylvania
- Oakland Township, Venango County, Pennsylvania
