= Restoration of the Melchizedek priesthood =

Restoration of the Melchizedek priesthood may refer to:

- Restoration of the Melchizedek priesthood, an 1829 event in which Joseph Smith claimed to receive God's power and authority
- Restoration of the Melchizedek Priesthood, a 1960s sculpture by Avard Fairbanks
