= West Auckland =

West Auckland most commonly refers to:

- West Auckland, New Zealand
- West Auckland, County Durham, England

West Auckland may also refer to:

== Locations ==
- West Auckland Airport, near Parakai in the northwestern Auckland Region of New Zealand
- West Auckland (New Zealand electorate), a former parliamentary electorate in New Zealand
- West Auckland railway station, in County Durham, England
- Etherley, a parish in County Durham, England formerly called "West Auckland"

== Sports teams ==
- West Auckland Town F.C., a football club in County Durham, England
- West Auckland Admirals, an ice hockey team in Auckland, New Zealand
- West Auckland Kiwi True Blues FC, a football club in Auckland, New Zealand

== See also ==
- Auckland West (New Zealand electorate), a former parliamentary electorate in New Zealand
- Auckland (disambiguation)
