= Restoration of the Aaronic Priesthood (sculpture) =

Sculpture in Salt Lake City, Utah, U.S.

- John the Baptist, Priesthood Restoration
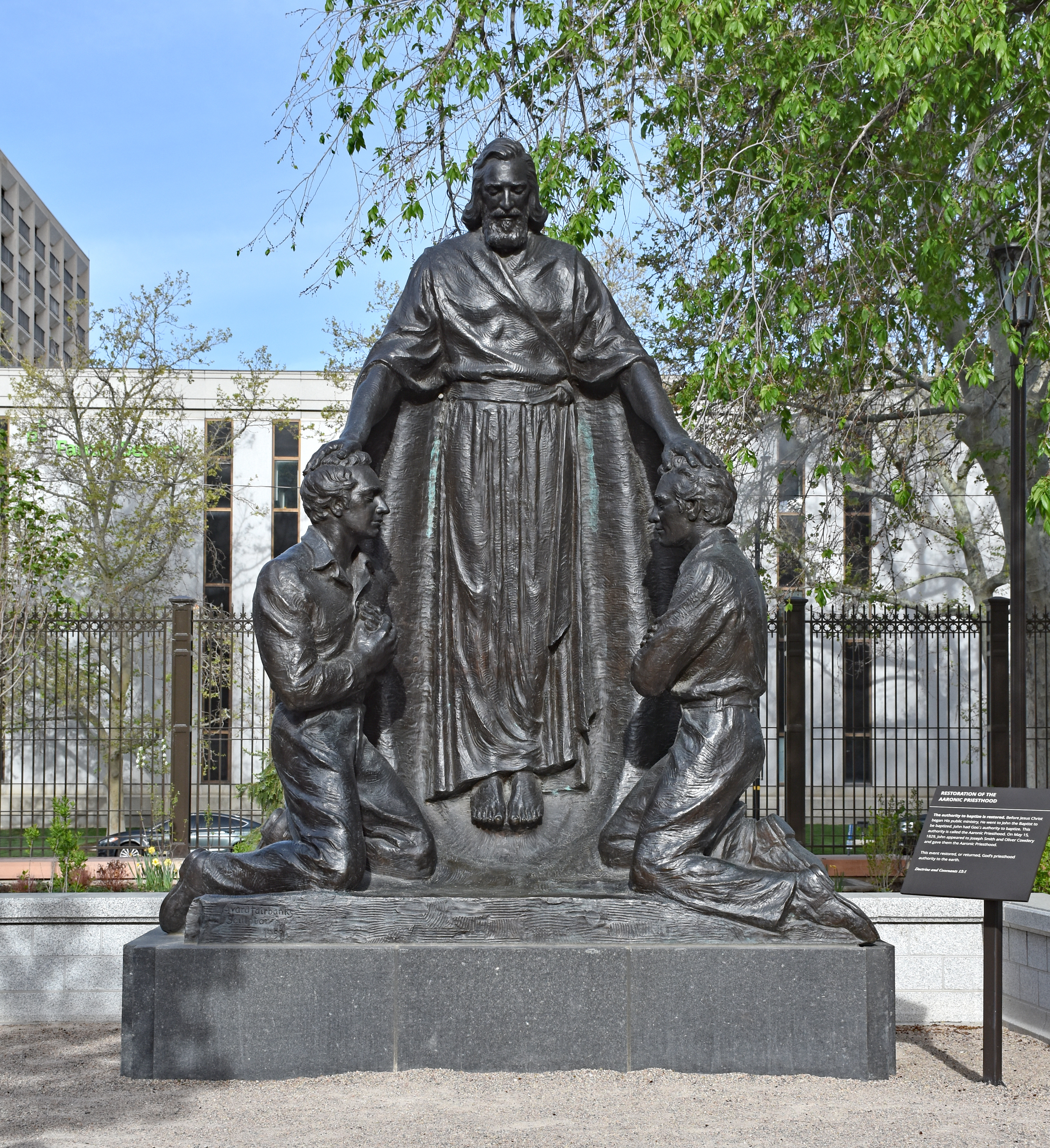
- Temple Square, 2025
- Artist: Avard Fairbanks
- Completion date: 1957
- Medium: Bronze sculpture
- Subject: John the Baptist; Oliver Cowdery; Joseph Smith
- Dimensions: 3.0 m × 2.4 m × 1.2 m (10 ft × 8 ft × 4 ft)
- Location: Fairview Museum of History and Art (Fairview, Utah); Priesthood Restoration Site (Oakland Township, Pennsylvania); Temple Square (Salt Lake City, Utah)
- 40°46′12.35″N 111°53′36.80″W

Restoration of the Aaronic Priesthood: John the Baptist (also known simply as Priesthood Restoration or John the Baptist) is a 1957 bronze sculpture by Avard Fairbanks, installed in Salt Lake City’s Temple Square, in the U.S. state of Utah. The sculpture commemorates the restoration of the Aaronic priesthood, an event in which, according to Latter-day Saint belief, the lesser order of the power and authority of God was given to male leaders of the church.

Besides the sculpture at Temple Square, a plaster version is on display at the Fairview Museum of History and Art in Fairview, Utah, and an additional bronze casting, together with a separate relief version of the artwork, are located at the Priesthood Restoration Site in Oakland Township, Pennsylvania.

== Description ==
The statue portrays an 1829 event in which Latter-day Saints believe the Aaronic priesthood was given to Joseph Smith and Oliver Cowdery. It depicts John the Baptist in robes with his hands on the heads of Smith and Cowdery, both of whom are kneeling at his side. The act of laying on of hands was part of their ordination to the Aaronic priesthood.

The statue measures approximately 10 x 8 x 4 feet and rests on a stone base which measures approximately 7 x 10 x 6 feet. Formerly, a nearby plaque read:

Restoration of the / Aaronic Priesthood / John the Baptist, the biblical prophet who / baptized Jesus Christ, conferred the Priest / hood of Aaron upon Joseph Smith (left) and Oliver Cowdery (right) on May 15, 1829, on the bank of the Susquahanna River in / Pennsylvania. The priesthood, which holds / the authority to baptize for remission of / sins and entrance into the kingdom of God / had been absent from the earth for centu / ries. The latter-day restoration by John / the Baptist made the blessings of baptism again / available to all mankind.

== History ==
The sculpture was originally announced by Joseph L. Wirthlin, the church's Presiding Bishop, during general conference in October 1956. The artwork would be part of a monument on Temple Square to commemorate the restoration of the Aaronic priesthood, to be dedicated on May 15, 1957, the 128th anniversary of the event. Funds for the project were raised from the Aaronic priesthood's membership, with youth members encouraged to donate 50¢ and adult members $1.00 (equivalent to $12 in 2025). The idea for the monument dated back to the previous year, beginning with the Cottonwood 2nd Ward and its bishop, James E. Faust.

The statue was cast by Roman Bronze Works in New York City, and placed on Temple Square in September 1957 (resulting in its dedication being pushed later than originally announced). Prior to the bronze sculpture's installation, a copper box with the names of nearly 60,000 Aaronic priesthood members who had contributed to the project was placed into the monument's base. The church did not have to provide any funds for its completion, as donations covered the entire cost. After its placement on Temple Square, the statue would remain veiled until its dedication on October 4, during general conference. Shortly before the start of that conference, the church announced the meetings would be cancelled for that year, due to the 1957–1958 influenza pandemic. As such, the dedication was delayed and the Presiding Bishopric removed the covering from the monument on October 25, 1957. The official dedication of the monument took place on October 10, 1958, with a prayer by David O. McKay, president of the church.

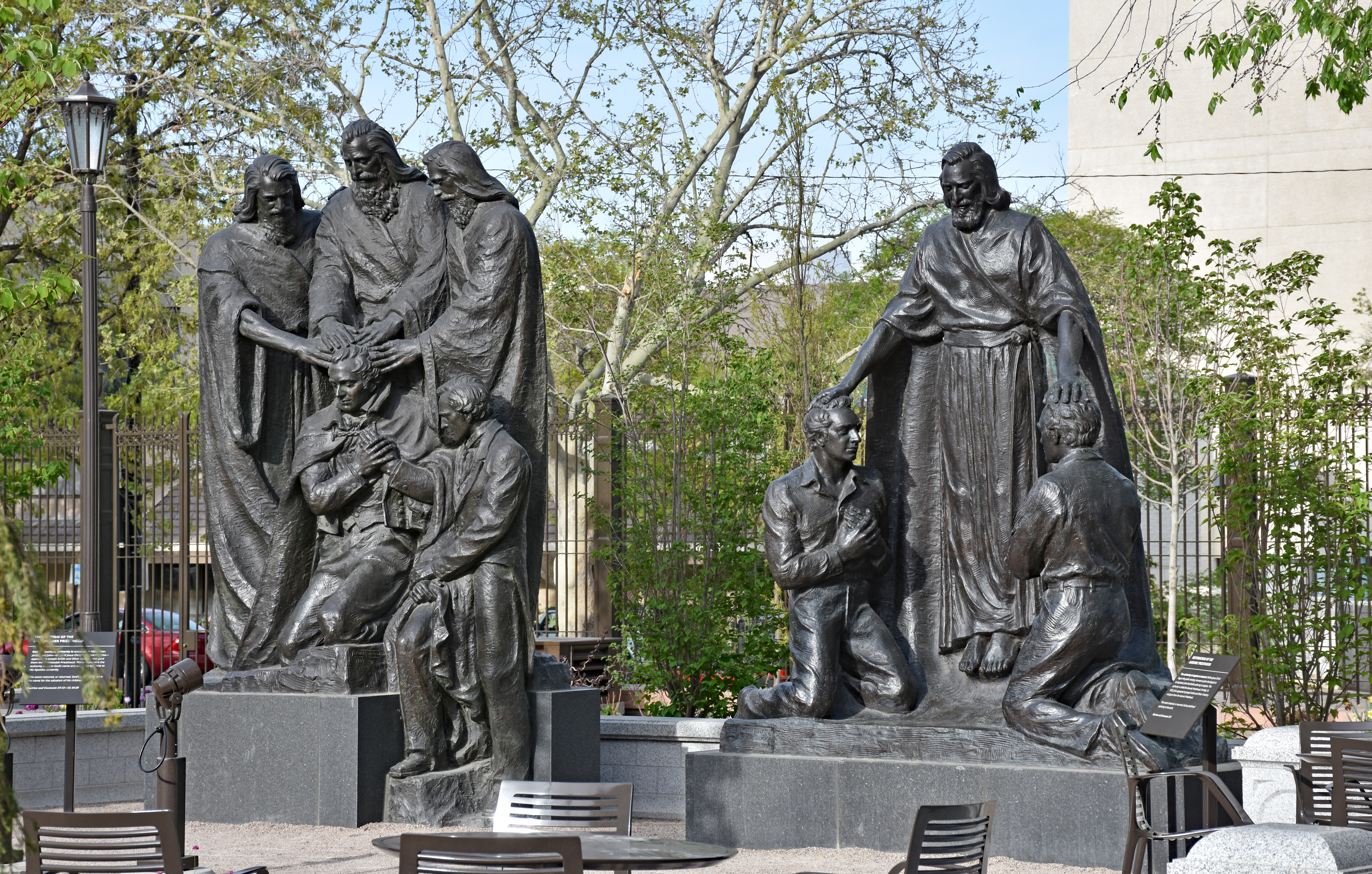
Fairbanks' two Priesthood Restoration statues on Temple Square

The sculpture's original placement on Temple Square was just north of the Salt Lake Tabernacle. When construction on the North Visitors Center started in 1960, the statue was boxed in to prevent damage since it was so close to the site of the new center. The monument was later moved to a location just south of the Salt Lake Temple, near the eastern wall of Temple Square. In 2006, it was placed next to Fairbanks' Restoration of the Melchizedek Priesthood sculpture in an area between the temple and South Visitors Center. Both statues were moved to the southwest quarter of the block as part of the 2020s redevelopment of Temple Square.

The artwork is administered by the church's Museum of Church History and Art. It was surveyed by the Smithsonian Institution’s “Save Outdoor Sculpture” program in 1993.

=== Other versions ===
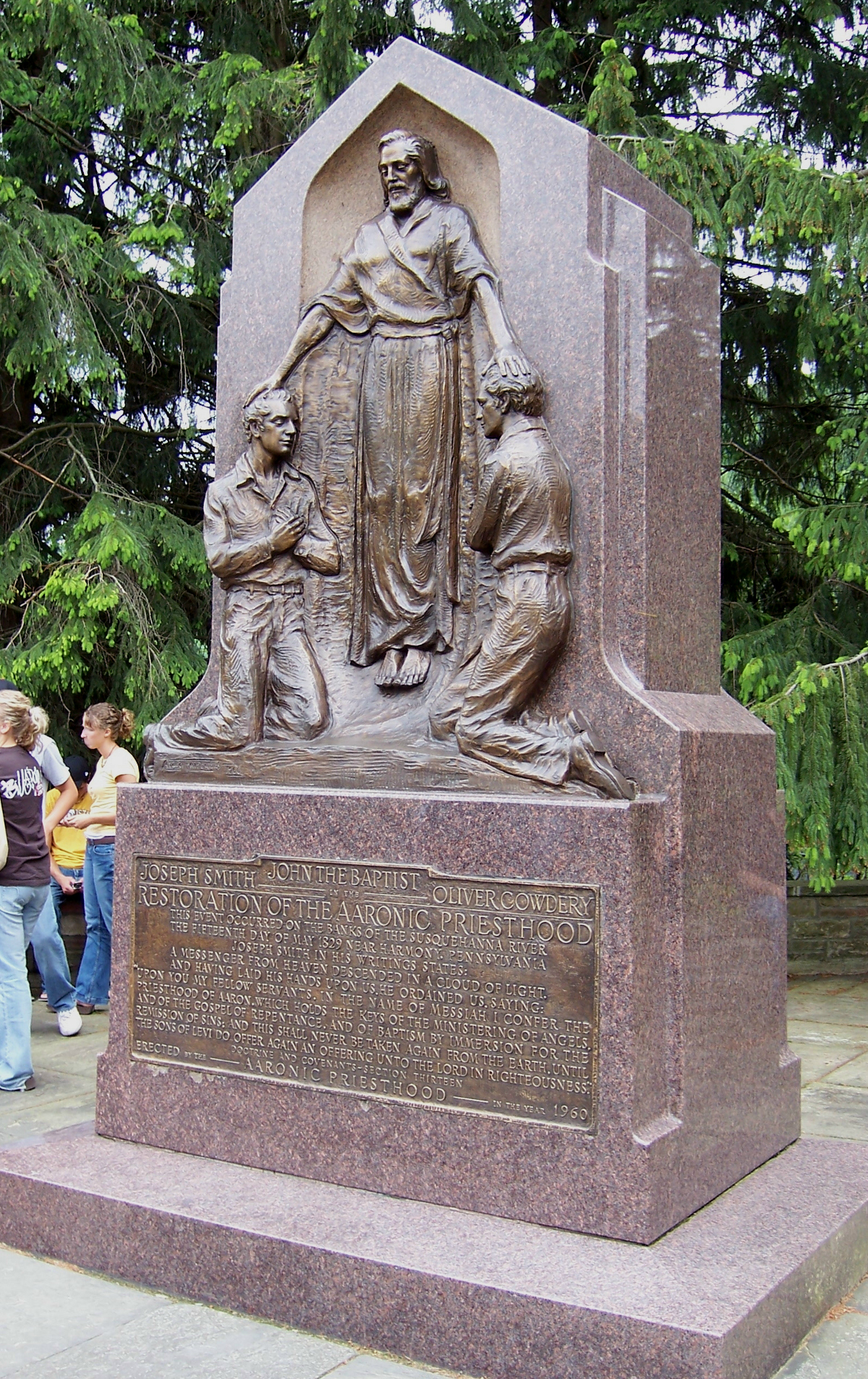
Relief version, as seen at the Priesthood Restoration Site

While work on the Temple Square monument was progressing, the church announced the project would expand to include a granite marker near the Pennsylvania site where the Aaronic priesthood had been restored in 1829. This marker would also be created by Fairbanks, and include a reproduction of his Aaronic priesthood sculpture, expect that it would be in the form of a relief. Similar to the 1957 monument, the church asked that the Aaronic priesthood provide the funds for its creation. The completed 12-foot-high (3.7 m) carnelian granite monument with bronze relief was dedicated at the Priesthood Restoration Site on June 18, 1960.

Fairbanks' original, full-size plaster model of the sculpture is on display at the Fairview Museum of History and Art in Fairview, Utah.

In September 2015, the church dedicated the newly restored and enhanced Priesthood Restoration Site. During the development of the site, new bronze castings of both of Fairbanks' Aaronic and Melchizedek priesthood restoration statues were placed near the meetinghouse/visitors' center. The castings were created by Peter M. Fillerup, a former art student of Fairbanks.
