= Restoration of the Melchizedek Priesthood (sculpture) =

Sculpture by Avard Fairbanks

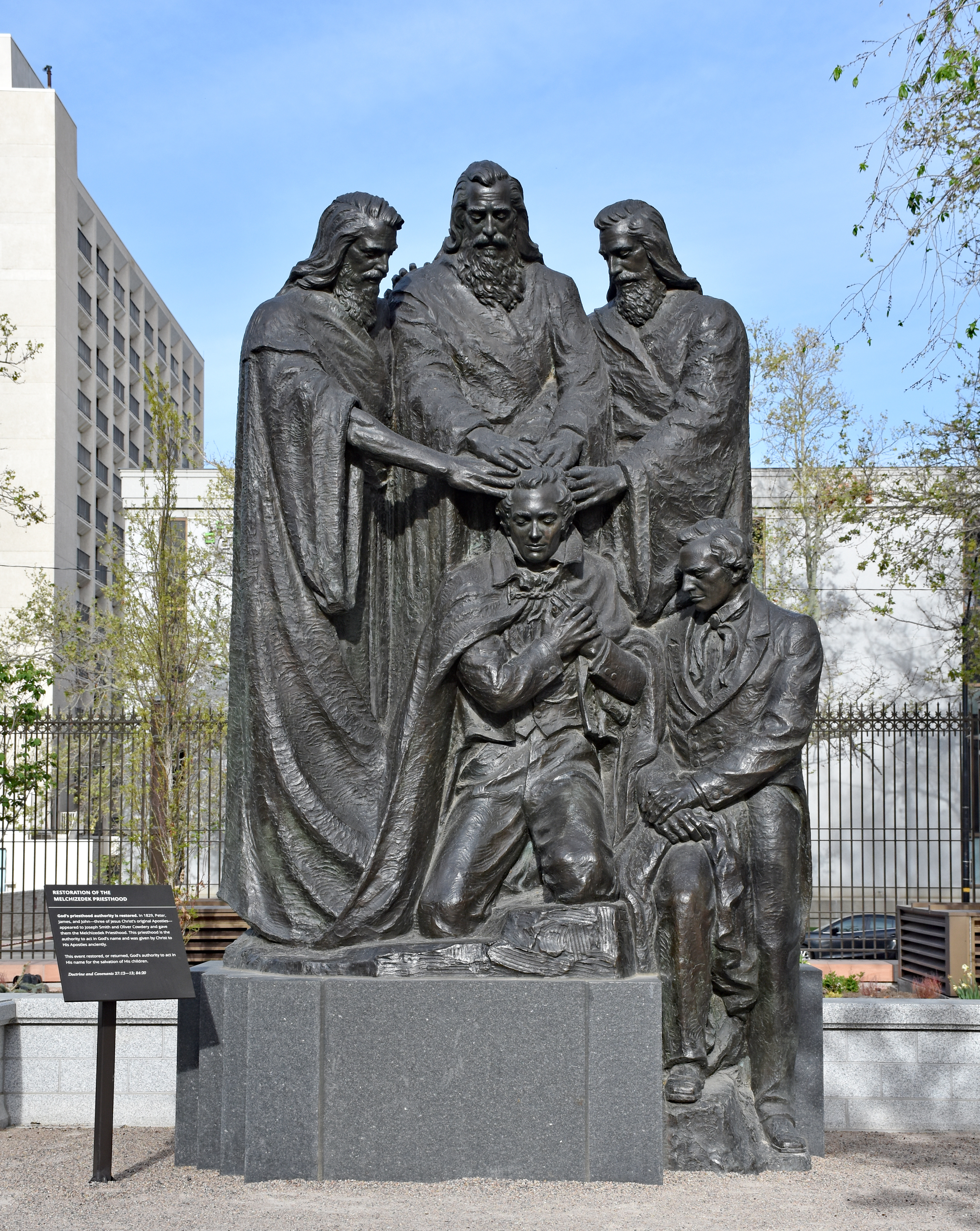
- Temple Square, 2025
- Artist: Avard Fairbanks
- Completion date: 1964
- Medium: Bronze sculpture
- Subject: Saint Peter; James the Great; John the Apostle; Joseph Smith; Oliver Cowdery
- Location: Fairview Museum of History and Art (Fairview, Utah); Priesthood Restoration Site (Oakland Township, Pennsylvania); Temple Square (Salt Lake City, Utah)
- 40°46′12.18″N 111°53′36.79″W

Restoration of the Melchizedek Priesthood is a 1960s bronze sculpture by Avard Fairbanks. The artwork was commissioned by the First Presidency of the Church of Jesus Christ of Latter-day Saints (LDS Church) for Temple Square in Salt Lake City, Utah, United States. The sculpture commemorates the restoration of the Melchizedek priesthood, an event in which, according to Latter-day Saint belief, the higher order of the power and authority of God was given to male leaders of the church.

Besides the sculpture at Temple Square, a plaster version is on display at the Fairview Museum of History and Art in Fairview, Utah, and an additional bronze casting is located at the Priesthood Restoration Site in Oakland Township, Pennsylvania.

== Description ==
The statue portrays an 1829 event in which Latter-day Saints believe the Melchizedek priesthood was given to Joseph Smith and Oliver Cowdery. It depicts three of Christ's apostles (Peter, James, and John) appearing as heavenly messengers, with their hands on the head of a kneeling Smith. The act of laying on of hands by the apostles was part of Smith's ordination to the Melchizedek priesthood. Cowdery, at Smith's side with a bowed head, waits for his own ordination.

== History ==
In June 1962, the First Presidency of the LDS Church announced they had commissioned artist Avard Fairbanks to create a monument to commemorate the restoration of the Melchizedek priesthood. The sculpture was meant to be a companion piece to his sculpture Restoration of the Aaronic Priesthood, which had been placed on Temple Square in 1957.

In April 1964, a full-sized plaster of the work was shipped to New York City, where it was put on display in the Mormon Pavilion at the 1964 New York World's Fair. After the fair, the church stored the plaster in a crate outside one its warehouses in Salt Lake City for many years. In the 1980s, the Fairbanks family petitioned the church for the plaster, so that it could be restored and placed in the Fairview Museum of History and Art in Fairview, Utah. The plaster had been damaged by the outdoor storage and move to Fairview, and by the time the restoration started, it had broken into approximately 200 pieces. The work was reassembled, restored and gilded by family members in the 1990s.

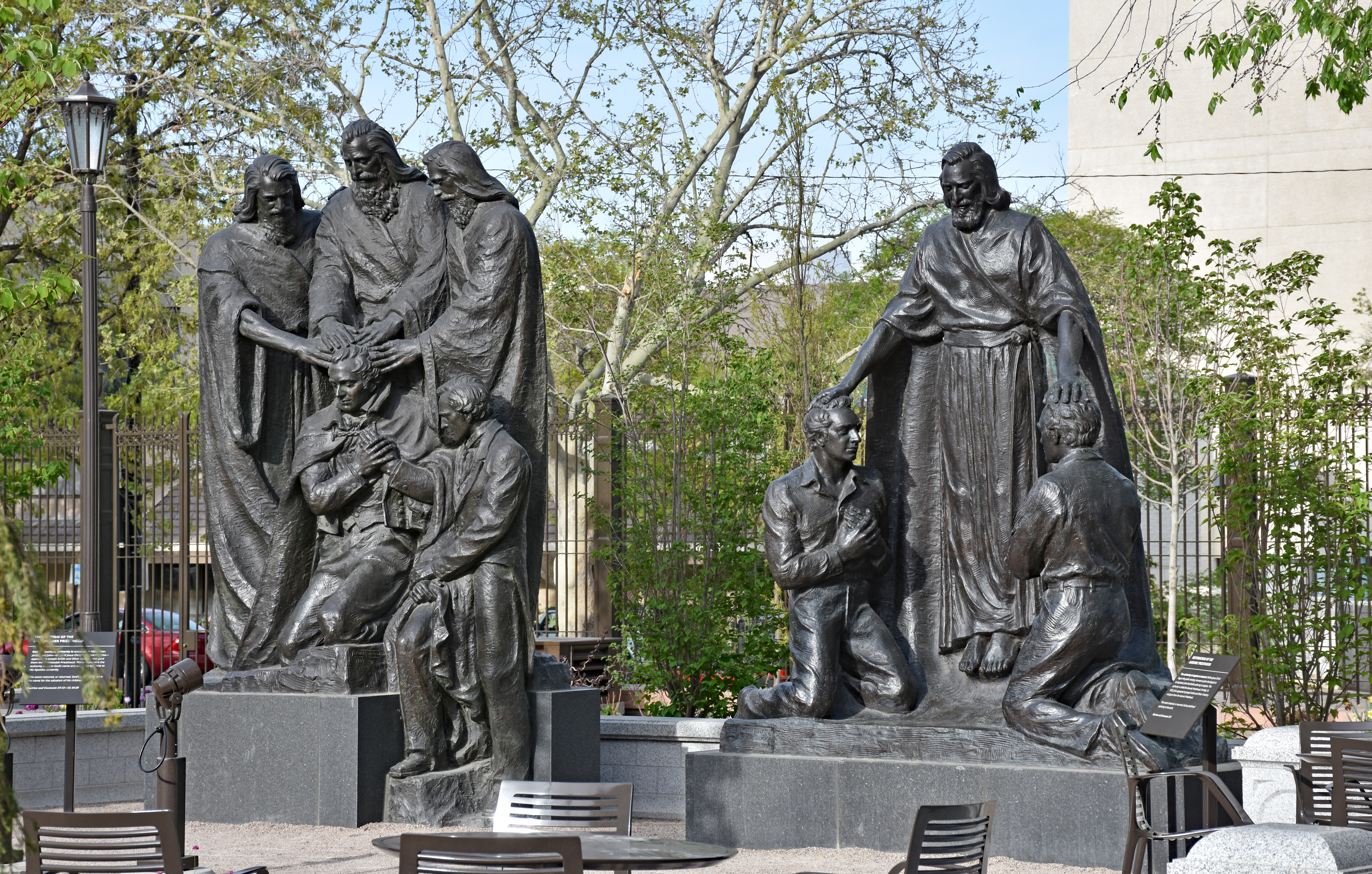
Fairbanks' two Priesthood Restoration statues on Temple Square

The bronze casting for Temple Square was completed in 1972. Although the sculpture was not added to Temple Square for several decades later, until 2006. It was placed next to Fairbanks' other sculpture, Restoration of the Aaronic Priesthood, in an area between the Salt Lake Temple and South Visitors Center. Both statues were moved to the southwest quarter of the block as part of the 2020s redevelopment of Temple Square.

In September 2015, the newly restored and enhanced Priesthood Restoration Site was dedicated. During the development of the site, bronze castings of both of Fairbanks' priesthood restoration statues were placed near the meetinghouse/visitors center. The castings were created by Peter M. Fillerup, a former art student of Fairbanks.
