= Oakland Historic District =

Oakland Historic District may refer to:

- Oakland Historic District (Phoenix, Arizona), listed on the NRHP in Maricopa County, Arizona
- Downtown Oakland Historic District, Oakland, California, listed on the NRHP in California
- Oakland Waterfront Warehouse District, Oakland, California, listed on the NRHP in California
- Meriden Avenue-Oakland Road Historic District, Southington, Connecticut, listed on the NRHP in Connecticut
- Oakland City Historic District, Atlanta, Georgia, listed on the NRHP in Georgia
- Oakland District, a historic district in the Oakland community area of Chicago, Illinois
- Oakland-Freeport Historic District, Oakland, Kentucky, listed on the NRHP in Kentucky
- Oakland Historic District (Oakland, Maryland), listed on the NRHP in Maryland
- Oakland Historic District (Oakland, Oregon), listed on the NRHP in Oregon
- Oakland Historic District (Burrillville, Rhode Island), listed on the NRHP in Rhode Island
- Oakland Avenue Historic District, Providence, Rhode Island, listed on the NRHP in Rhode Island
- Oakland-Dousman Historic District, Green Bay, Wisconsin, listed on the NRHP in Wisconsin

== See also ==
- Oakland (disambiguation)
