= Martin Montague =

British businessman

Martin Stuart Montague
- Born: May 1973 (age 53); Portsmouth, United Kingdom
- Citizenship: British
- Occupation: Businessman
- Known for: Developing an app to address fly-tipping
- Website: martinmontague.com

Martin Montague (born 1973) is a British businessman who is based in Portsmouth, UK. He is best known for building the ClearWaste application that allows people to report fly tipping.

== Early life and education ==
Martin Montague grew up on several council estates near Portsmouth including Leigh Park, and later Purbrook where he attended Oaklands Roman Catholic School in Waterlooville.

== Career ==
Montague started his career as a trainee car salesman in Portsmouth before getting a job as an estate agent. He took evening classes to help with his dyslexia before getting a job with Prudential PFPS as an executive consultant. By the time the company had made its entire direct sales force redundant, he was in the top three sales consultants in the country out of 6,000 staff.

In 1999 he was looking to start a virtual and scalable online business and came up with the idea to sell ringtones on the Internet. After the lifecycle for this product finished he started a new software company Symbios Solutions Ltd, which develops revenue optimisation and machine learning technology, servicing more than 3.5m users worldwide.

Other companies he founded included a surfwear company that he sold in 2016. He also purchased a distressed bike light manufacturer and invented and patented an accelerometer powered brake light that was subsequently sold in Halfords before the company was later sold.

=== ClearWaste application ===
Montague came up with the idea for ClearWaste to address fly-tipping. He spent over £250,000 developing the App to help combat the problem.

The ClearWaste app and website is linked to every local authority in the UK and gives councils the location with details and photographs of the rubbish to combat fly-tipping. Users can report instantly to the local council by taking a picture and filling in a few details with the app.

The app links consumers who have unwanted DIY materials also, allows users to get rid of junk by finding licensed waste companies.

Montague reported a rat-infested pile of filth in Mill Hill after receiving reports from the app that resulted in the mess being cleaned up by local authorities at a cost of £150,000. The rubbish estimated was about 300 lorry loads or around three football pitches.

It was reported that due to dump closures and an increase in DIY projects during the coronavirus lockdown figures from ClearWaste showed that overall fly-tipping is increased by 76-80 per cent.
