= Harmony Township, Susquehanna County, Pennsylvania =

Township in Pennsylvania, United States

- Township
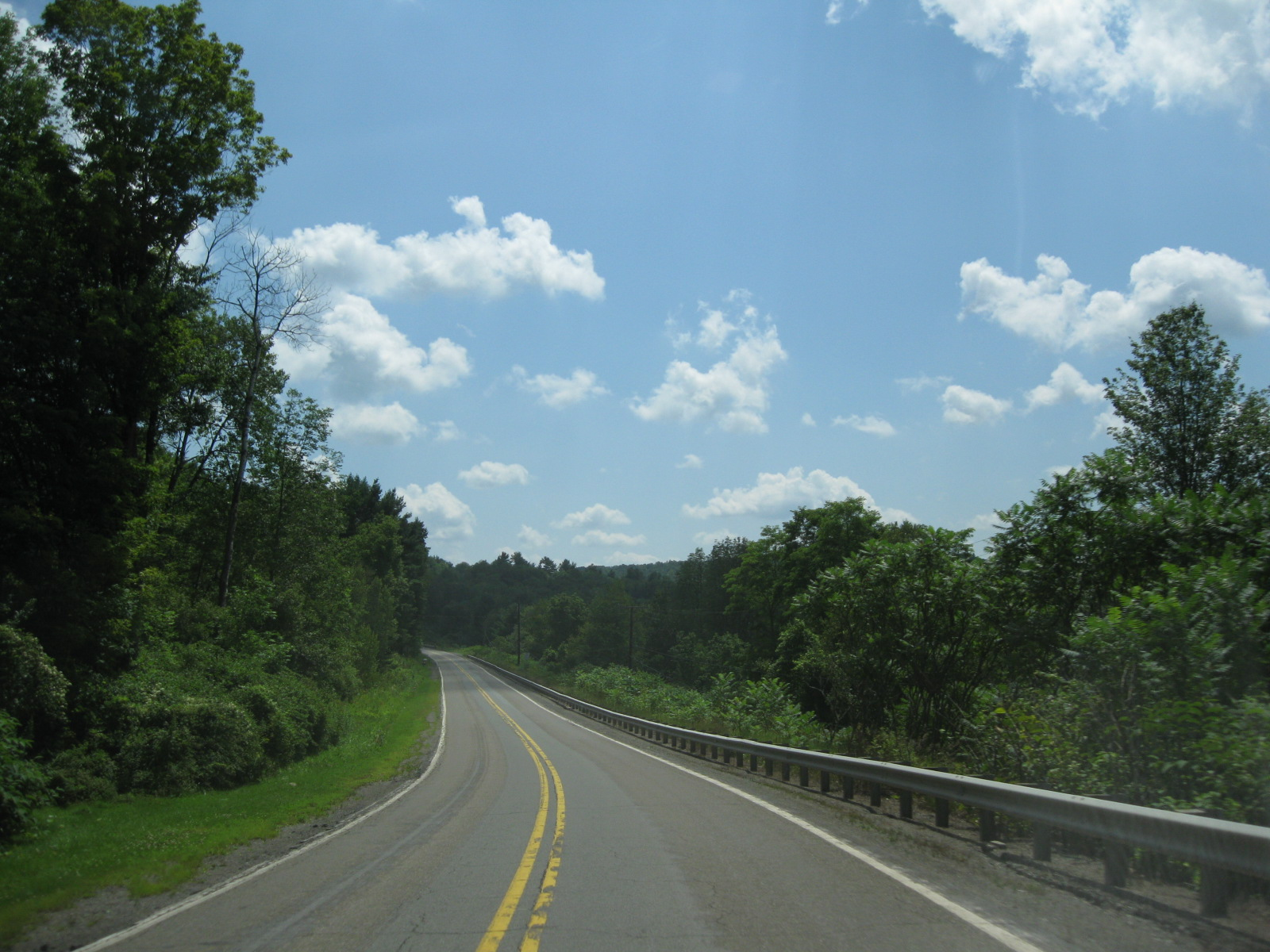
- Southbound PA 171 in Harmony Township

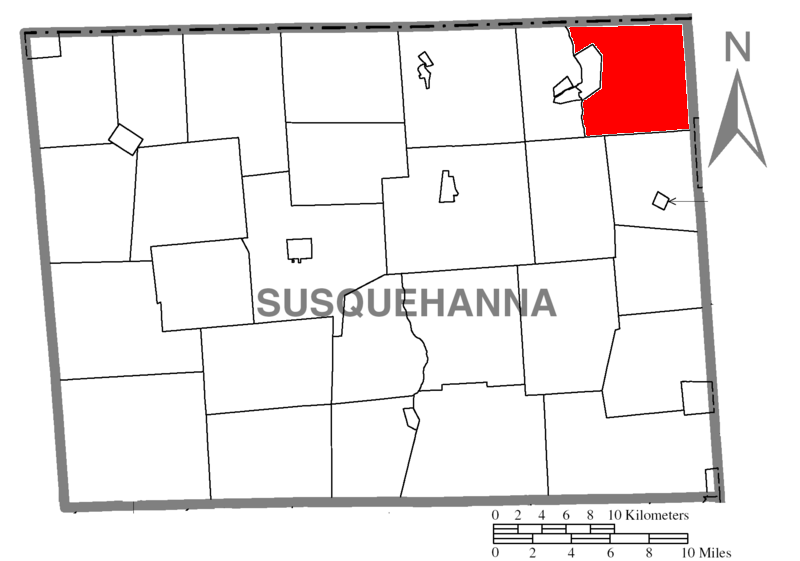
- Map of Susquehanna County, Pennsylvania highlighting Harmony Township

- Location of Susquehanna County in Pennsylvania
- Coordinates: 41°57′00″N 75°29′29″W
- Country: United States
- State: Pennsylvania
- County: Susquehanna
- Settled: 1789
- Incorporated: 1809

Area
  - Total: 31.62 sq mi (81.89 km^{2})
  - Land: 31.33 sq mi (81.15 km^{2})
  - Water: 0.29 sq mi (0.74 km^{2})

Population (2020)
  - Total: 512 ▼
  - Estimate (2021): 510
  - Density: 15.7/sq mi (6.06/km^{2})
- Time zone: UTC-5 (EST)
  - Summer (DST): UTC-4 (EDT)
- Zip Code: 18847
- Area code: 570
- FIPS code: 42-115-32720
- Website: www.susqco.com/subsites/gov/pages/info/municipaltownships/harmony.htm

Harmony Township is a township in Susquehanna County, Pennsylvania, United States. The population was 512 at the 2020 census.

== Geography ==
According to the United States Census Bureau, the township has a total area of 31.58 square miles (81.8 km^{2}), of which 31.3 square miles (81 km^{2}) is land and 0.28 square miles (0.73 km^{2}) (0.89%) is water.

== History ==
The area was first settled in 1789 when a road was built to connect Stockport on the Delaware River to the Susquehanna River at Cascade Creek.

Harmony Township was formed in 1809 from parts of Willingborough (now Great Bend Twp) and New Milford Townships. The present-day Ararat, Oakland, Jackson, and Thompson Townships were later split from parts of Harmony Township. The borough of Susquehanna Depot was created in 1853 from part of Harmony Township.

Gustav, Charles, and Albert Stickley formed Stickley Brothers and Company in the unincorporated village of Brandt in 1883 after learning furniture-making from their uncle, Jacob Schlager, and his business partner, W. H. Brandt. The 1880 US Census shows Barbara Stickley and her famous sons, Gustav and Charles Stickley living there as Chair Makers. Charles later owned the Stickley - Brandt Furniture Co, in Binghamton, NY. Brother Gustav started his own furniture factory in Eastwood, New York in the late 1890s. Brothers Leopold and John George started the L. & J.G. Stickley Furniture Co. in Fayetteville, NY in 1900. The L. & J.G. Stickley Furniture Company is currently located in Manlius, New York.

=== Joseph Smith and Mormonism ===
Harmony, Pennsylvania, is an important historical site in the Latter Day Saint movement. Latter Day Saints believe that Joseph Smith and Oliver Cowdery were visited by the angel of John the Baptist near Harmony in 1829, where he bestowed on Smith and Cowdery the Aaronic priesthood. Smith and Cowdery subsequently baptized one another in the Susquehanna River.

Other significant events occurred there during the periodic residence of Smith from 1825 to 1830. Smith and his father boarded in the residence of Isaac Hale in 1825 while employed by a man named Josiah Stowell to locate "a valuable mine of either Gold or Silver and also...coined money and bars or ingots of Gold or Silver" using Smith's presumed skills in the practice of scrying, or using "peep stones", to locate buried treasure by means of divination. It was during this time that Smith became acquainted with Hale's daughter, Emma Hale, whom he would later marry despite her parents' disapproval. In December 1827, Smith and Emma moved to Harmony from Manchester, New York, to work on the Book of Mormon. Eventually they bought a small farm and house, where most of the Book of Mormon was produced between April 7 and early June 1829. The first convert baptism, that of Samuel H. Smith, took place there ten days after Smith and Cowdery had baptized each other. Smith also claimed that somewhere between Harmony and Colesville, New York, the apostles Peter, James, and John appeared to him and Cowdery and bestowed on them the Melchizedek priesthood. After Smith organized the Church of Christ in 1830, Smith and Emma returned to Harmony and lived there through that summer. Of the many writings Smith claims were divine revelations received by prophecy and now recorded in the Doctrine and Covenants, fifteen were written in Harmony.

The Harmony in Latter Day Saint history refers to a township rather than a village or borough. The township boundary was changed in 1853, placing the Latter Day Saint sites in present-day Oakland Township. The site of the Hale residence, Smith residence (which burned in 1919), and a public cemetery containing the graves of Isaac and Elizabeth Hale and of an infant son born to Joseph and Emma, lie about a mile and a half west of present-day Oakland, Pennsylvania, in Susquehanna County.

Today, the Church of Jesus Christ of Latter-day Saints owns about 288 acres at the location, and operates the Priesthood Restoration Site historic area. The historic site was developed in 2015 and includes a visitor center, the reconstructed Smith and Hale homes, and several monuments. The exact location of the restoration is not known.

== Demographics ==
Historical population
Census	Pop.	Note	%±
2010	528		—
2020	512		−3.0%
2021 (est.)	510		−0.4%
U.S. Decennial Census

As of the census of 2010, there were 528 people, 214 households, and 151 families residing in the township. The population density was 16.9 people per square mile (6.5 people/km^{2}). There were 350 housing units at an average density of 11.2 per square mile (4.3/km^{2}). The racial makeup of the township was 99% White, 0.2% Black, 0.2% American Indian, 0.2% Asian, 0.2% some other race and 0.2% two or more races. Hispanic or Latino of any race were 1.7% of the population.

There were 214 households, out of which 26.2% had children under the age of 18 living with them, 59.3% were married couples living together, 6.1% had a female householder with no husband present, and 29.4% were non-families. 20.6% of all households were made up of individuals, and 8% had someone living alone who was 65 years of age or older. The average household size was 2.47 and the average family size was 2.76.

In the township, the population was spread out, with 17% under the age of 18, 65.4% from 18 to 64, and 17.6% who were 65 years of age or older. The median age was 47.6 years.

The median income for a household in the township was $46,944, and the median income for a family was $78,750. Males had a median income of $40,208 versus $19,063 for females. The per capita income for the township was $29,827. About 3.3% of families and 7.7% of the population were below the poverty line, including 8.1% of those under age 18 and 5.3% of those age 65 or over.

== Communities and locations in Harmony Township ==
- Bethel Hill – A hamlet south of the township on Route 171 next to Comfort Pond.
- Brandt – A hamlet crossing Starrucca Creek.
- Devils Punch Bowl – A lake surrounded by steep cliffs.
- Jefferson Junction – A Location between Brandt and Lanesboro on Starrucca Creek.
- King Hill – A Geological Feature near the center of the township.
- Melrose – A Hamlet between Stevens Point and Starrucca.
- Riverview – A Riverside Community west of the township.
- Round Hill – A Geological Feature north of the township.
- State Game Lands 70 – A public land organized by the PGC.
- Stevens Point – A hamlet between State Route 1011 and 1009.
- Taylor Hill – A Geological Feature west of the township.
- The Belize Fund Native American Cultural Center – A Cultural Center south of the township.

== Sources ==
- Brooke, John L. (1994). The Refiner's Fire: The Making of Mormon Cosmology, 1644–1844. New York, NY: Cambridge University Press. ISBN 0-521-34545-6.
- Bushman, Richard Lyman (2005). Joseph Smith: Rough Stone Rolling. New York, NY: Alfred A. Knopf. ISBN 1-4000-4270-4.
- Jortner, Adam (2022). No Place for Saints: Mobs and Mormons in Jacksonian America. Witness to History. Baltimore, MD: Johns Hopkins University Press. ISBN 978-1-4214-4176-4.
- Newell, Linda King; Avery, Valeen Tippetts (1994). Mormon Enigma: Emma Hale Smith (2nd ed.). Urbana, IL: University of Illinois Press. ISBN 0-252-06291-4.
- Persuitte, David (2000). Joseph Smith and the Origins of the Book of Mormon. Jefferson, NC: McFarland & Co. ISBN 0-7864-0826-X.
- Quinn, D. Michael (1998). Early Mormonism and the Magic World View (2nd ed.). Salt Lake City, UT: Signature Books. ISBN 1-56085-089-2.
