= Statue of Daniel C. Jackling =

Bronze statue in Salt Lake City, Utah, U.S.

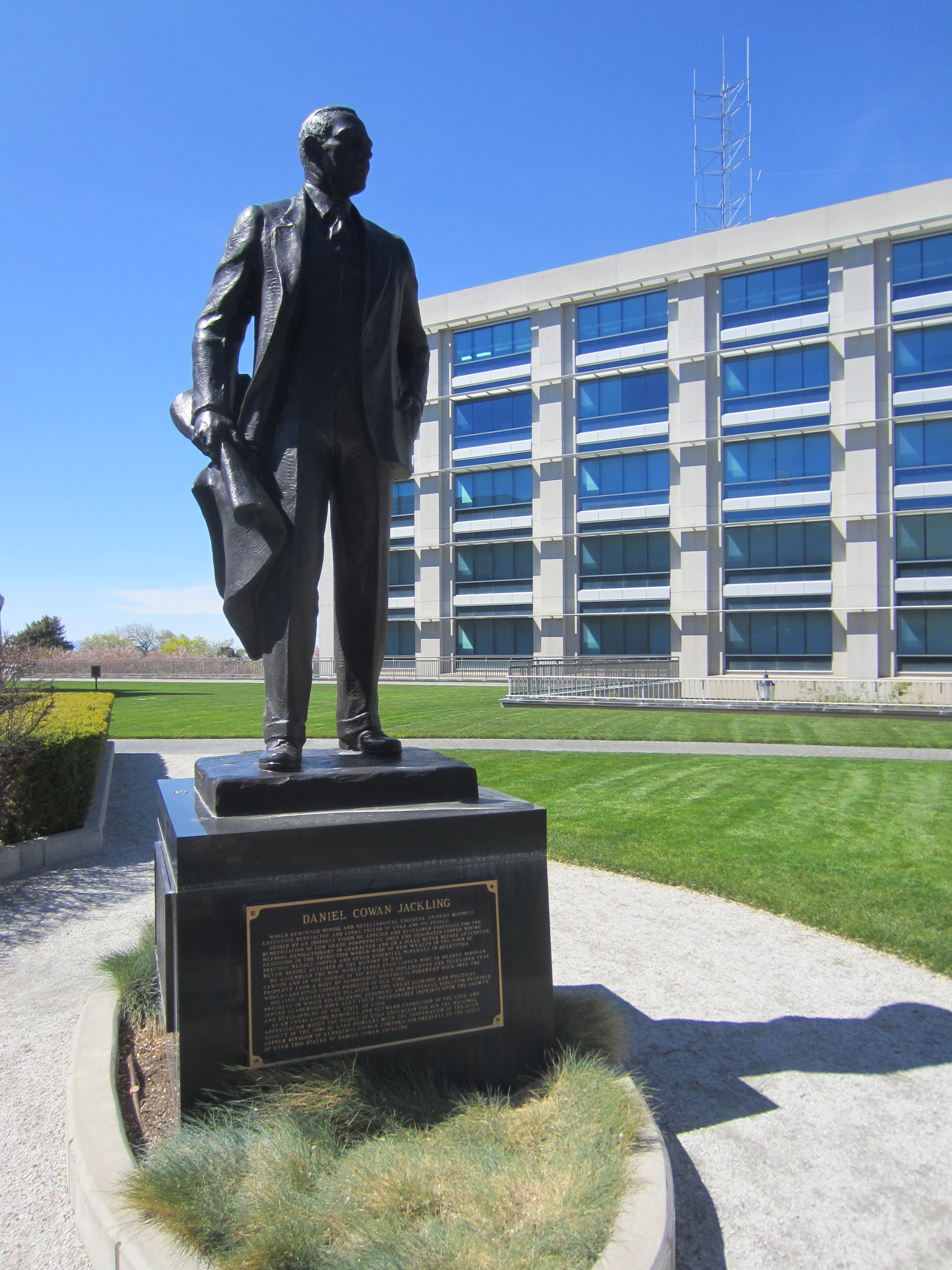
- The statue in 2021
- Artist: Avard Fairbanks
- Medium: Bronze sculpture
- Subject: Daniel C. Jackling
- Location: Utah State Capitol; Salt Lake City; 40°46′41.7″N 111°53′18.6″W

A bronze statue of Daniel C. Jackling by Avard Fairbanks is installed outside the Utah State Capitol in Salt Lake City, in the U.S. state of Utah.
