= Oakland Plantation =

Oakland Plantation may refer to the following American plantations:

- Oakland Plantation (Bossier Parish, Louisiana)
- Oakland Plantation House (Gurley, Louisiana), listed on the National Register of Historic Places (NRHP) in East Feliciana Parish, Louisiana
- Oakland Plantation (Natchitoches, Louisiana), a U.S. National Historic Landmark in Natchitoches Parish, Louisiana
- Oakland Plantation (Carvers, North Carolina), listed on the NRHP in Bladen County, North Carolina
- Oakland Plantation (Tarboro, North Carolina), listed on the NRHP in Edgecombe County, North Carolina
- Oakland Plantation (Beech Island, South Carolina), listed on the NRHP in Aiken County, South Carolina
- Oakland Plantation (Fort Motte, South Carolina), listed on the NRHP in Calhoun County, South Carolina
- Oakland Plantation House (Mount Pleasant, South Carolina), listed on the NRHP in Charleston County, South Carolina

== See also ==
- Oakland (disambiguation), which includes several NRHP places named Oakland which may be plantations
