= Auckland (disambiguation) =

Auckland is the largest city in New Zealand.

Auckland may also refer to:

== Places ==
=== New Zealand ===
- Auckland isthmus, the isthmus and central suburbs of Auckland
- Auckland City, the local government district of central Auckland until 2010
- Auckland Province, a former province
- Auckland Region, the local government region that includes the Auckland metropolitan area
  - Auckland Council, the local government authority for the Auckland Region

=== South Korea ===
- Mount Auckland or Hallasan, a peak on Jeju Island

=== United States ===
- Auckland, California, unincorporated community in Tulare County

== People ==
- Baron Auckland, a barony and earldom in the peerages of Ireland and of Great Britain

=== Given name ===
- Auckland Colvin (1838–1908), British colonial administrator
- Auckland Geddes, 1st Baron Geddes (1879–1954), British politician and diplomat
- Auckland Hector (1945–2017), Kittitian cricketer

=== Surname ===
- Adam Auckland (born 1993), English professional squash player
- George Auckland, British television executive
- James Auckland (born 1980), British tennis player

== Sport ==
- Auckland (Mitre 10 Cup), a professional rugby union team in Auckland, New Zealand
- Auckland (women's field hockey team), an amateur team in Auckland, New Zealand
- Auckland City FC, an association football club based in Auckland, New Zealand that plays in the Northern League
- Auckland FC, an association football club based in Auckland, New Zealand that plays in the A-League Men

== Other uses ==
- Auckland (Countess of Ranfurly's Own) and Northland Regiment, a Territorial Force Battalion of the Royal New Zealand Infantry Regiment
- Auckland (wine), a New Zealand wine
- Auckland (meteorite), a meteorite that landed in New Zealand
- Auckland Castle, residence of the Bishop of Durham in Bishop Auckland
- Greater Auckland (advocacy group), non-profit group in Auckland, New Zealand

== See also ==
- Aukland (disambiguation)
- Oakland (disambiguation)
