= Oakland High School =

Oakland High School may refer to:

- Oakland High School (Oakland, California), Oakland, California
- Oakland High School (Oregon), Oakland, Oregon
- Oakland High School (Illinois), Oakland, Illinois
- Oakland High School (Tennessee), Murfreesboro, Tennessee
- Oakland Alternative High School, Tacoma, Washington
- Oakland Catholic High School, Pittsburgh, Pennsylvania
- Oakland Craig High School, Oakland, Nebraska
- Oakland Mills High School, Columbia, Maryland
- Oakland School for the Arts, Oakland, California
- Oakland Technical High School, Oakland, California
- Oakland Senior High School (Oakland, California)
- Oakland Senior High School, a former school for African Americans in Haines City, Florida
