= Priesthood Restoration Site =

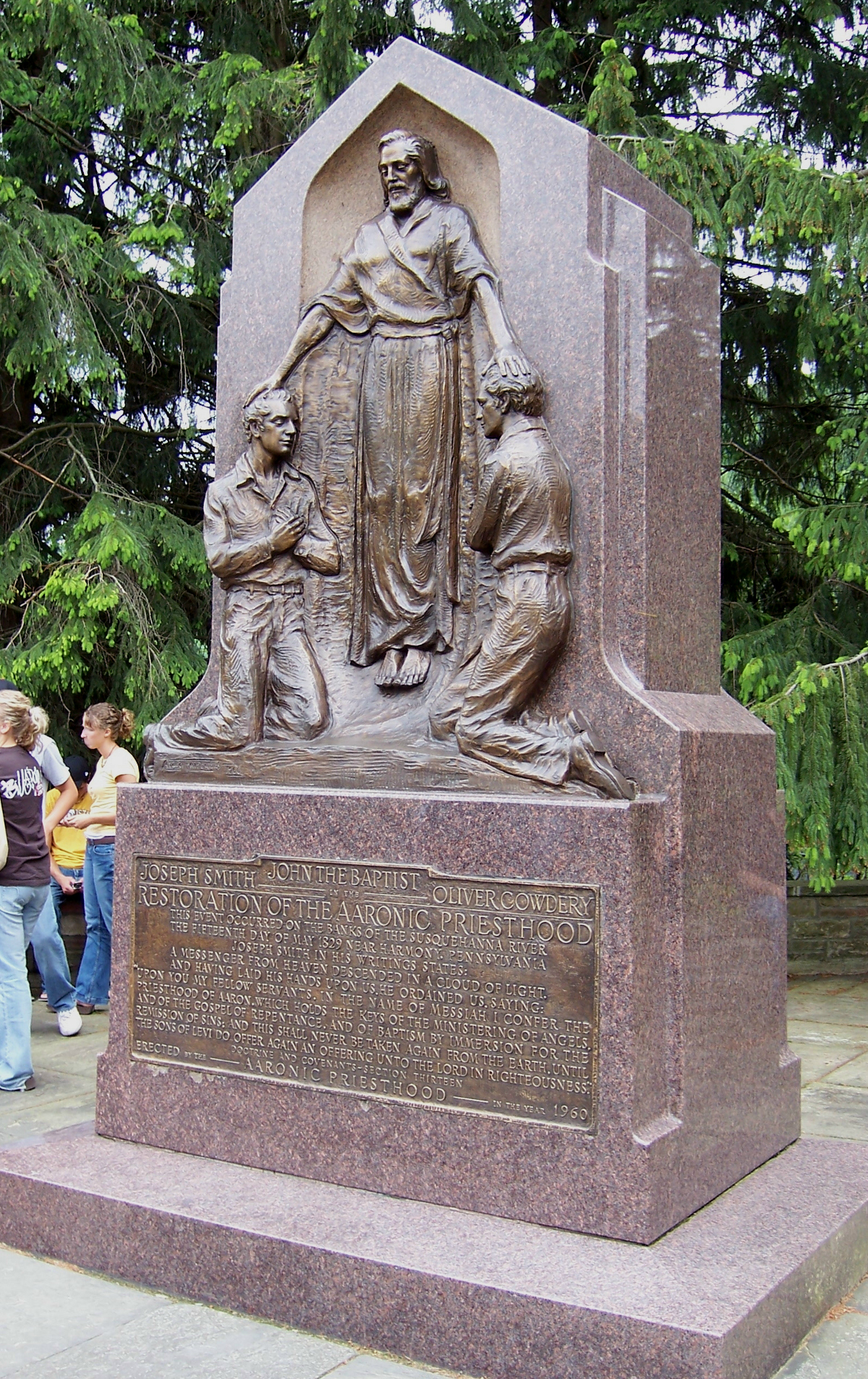
- Monument depicting the restoration of the Aaronic Priesthood, erected at the site in 1960

- Site location within Pennsylvania, US
- 41.9512°N 75.6387°W
- Location: Oakland Township, Pennsylvania, United States

History
- Years of significance: 1827–1830

Site notes
- Elevation: 955 feet (291 m)
- Area: 157 acres (64 ha)
- Governing body: The Church of Jesus Christ of Latter-day Saints

The Priesthood Restoration Site, formally known as the Aaronic Priesthood Restoration Site, is a historic site located in Oakland Township, Susquehanna County, Pennsylvania, United States. The site comprises property once owned by Joseph Smith, and is the spot where Latter Day Saints believe the resurrected John the Baptist conferred the Aaronic priesthood upon Smith and Oliver Cowdery in 1829.

In the 1940s, the Church of Jesus Christ of Latter-day Saints (LDS Church) began purchasing the properties in the area which had formerly belonged to Smith and his father-in-law, Isaac Hale. A monument commemorating the priesthood restoration was added by the church in June 1960. In September 2015, following an extensive development project, a church-operated visitors' center and meetinghouse, monuments, and the reconstructed homes of Smith and the Hale family were dedicated.

== History ==
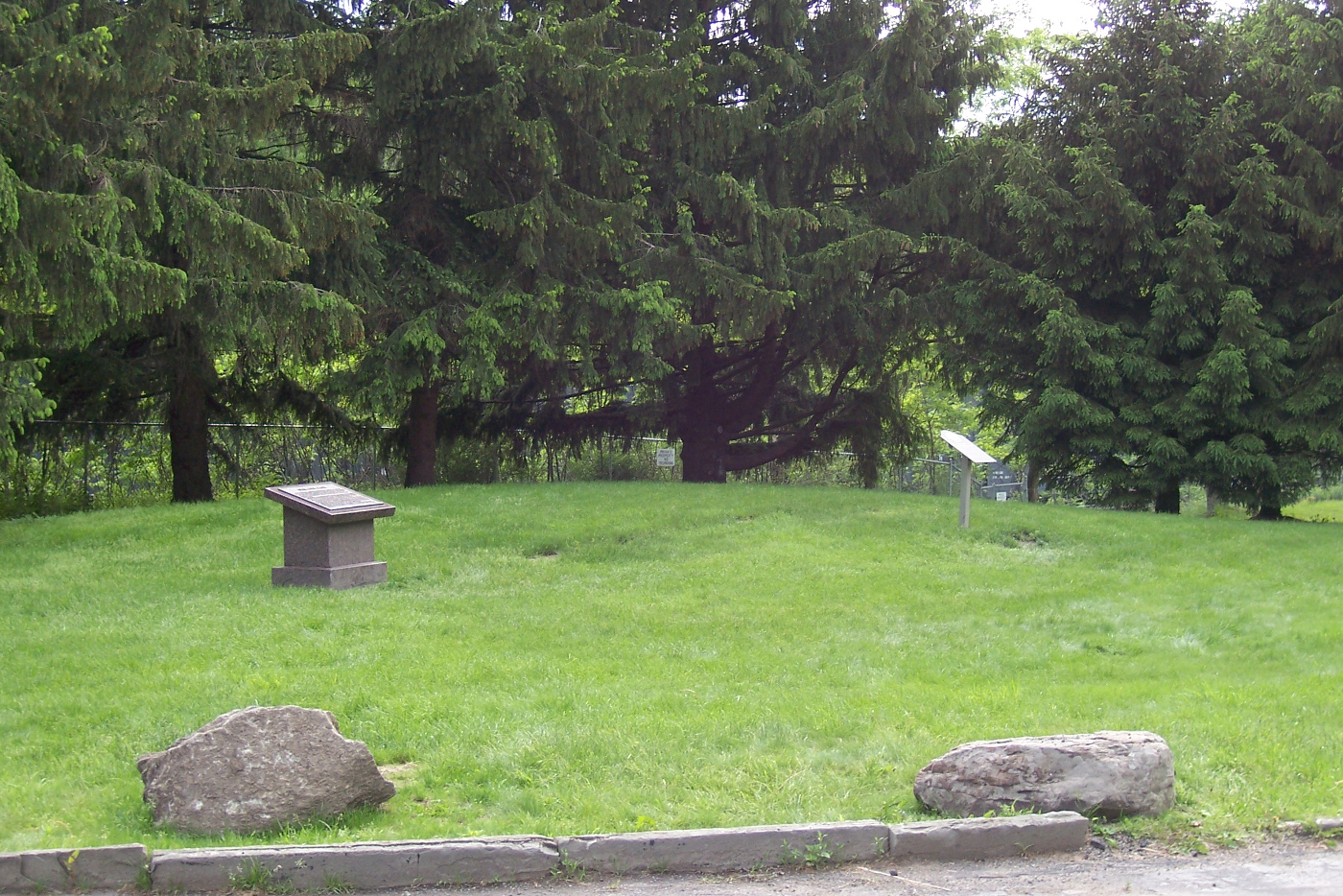
Site of the Joseph Smith home, before its reconstruction

In December 1827, Smith and his wife, Emma, moved to the area, hoping to escape persecution experienced in Palmyra, New York. After arriving, the Smiths purchased 13.5 acres (5.5 ha) from Emma's father, Isaac Hale. In Smith's day, the property was located in the Harmony Township of Susquehanna County; when the Oakland Township was incorporated in 1853, it included the land in question. Emma had been raised in Harmony, and many of her family members lived in the area. Her brother, Jesse Hale, had constructed a three-room frame home which the Smiths purchased and had moved onto their property.

While living in the home, the Smith's first child, Alvin, was born and died. Alvin is buried just east of the historic site in the McKune Cemetery.

According to Mormon history, a large portion of the Book of Mormon was translated by Smith while living in the home. Smith stated that the Aaronic priesthood was restored to him and Cowdery on May 15, 1829, somewhere in the woods near the home. After being given the priesthood by John the Baptist by the laying on of hands, the two men baptized each other in the nearby Susquehanna River. Following the baptisms, they ordained each other to the Aaronic priesthood. Soon after, Smith said the Melchizedek priesthood was restored to him and Cowdery somewhere nearby.

The Smith family left the area and their home, moving to Fayette, New York, in August 1830. In 1919, the home lived in by the Smiths was destroyed by fire.

=== Property acquisition and developments ===
In 1946, the LDS Church purchased 80 acres (32 ha) of property in the area, which included the location of the former Smith home, of which only the foundation remained. Two years later, the church purchased an additional 80 acres (32 ha), which included the site of the Hale home, whose foundation also remained. In the decades that followed, additional land was purchased, expanding the church's holdings in the area. Some of these additional purchases included 25 acres (10 ha) of land which had been heavily polluted by adjacent railroad activity; this 2002 purchase extended the church's holdings to the river. In January 2011, 10 acres (4.0 ha) were purchased from the Boughton family for $2.1 million (equivalent to $3,005,547 in 2025).

On June 18, 1960, a monument was dedicated at the site to commemorate the restoration of the Aaronic priesthood. The 12-foot-high (3.7 m) carnelian granite monument includes a bronze relief by artist Avard Fairbanks, depicting John the Baptist conferring the priesthood on Smith and Cowdery.

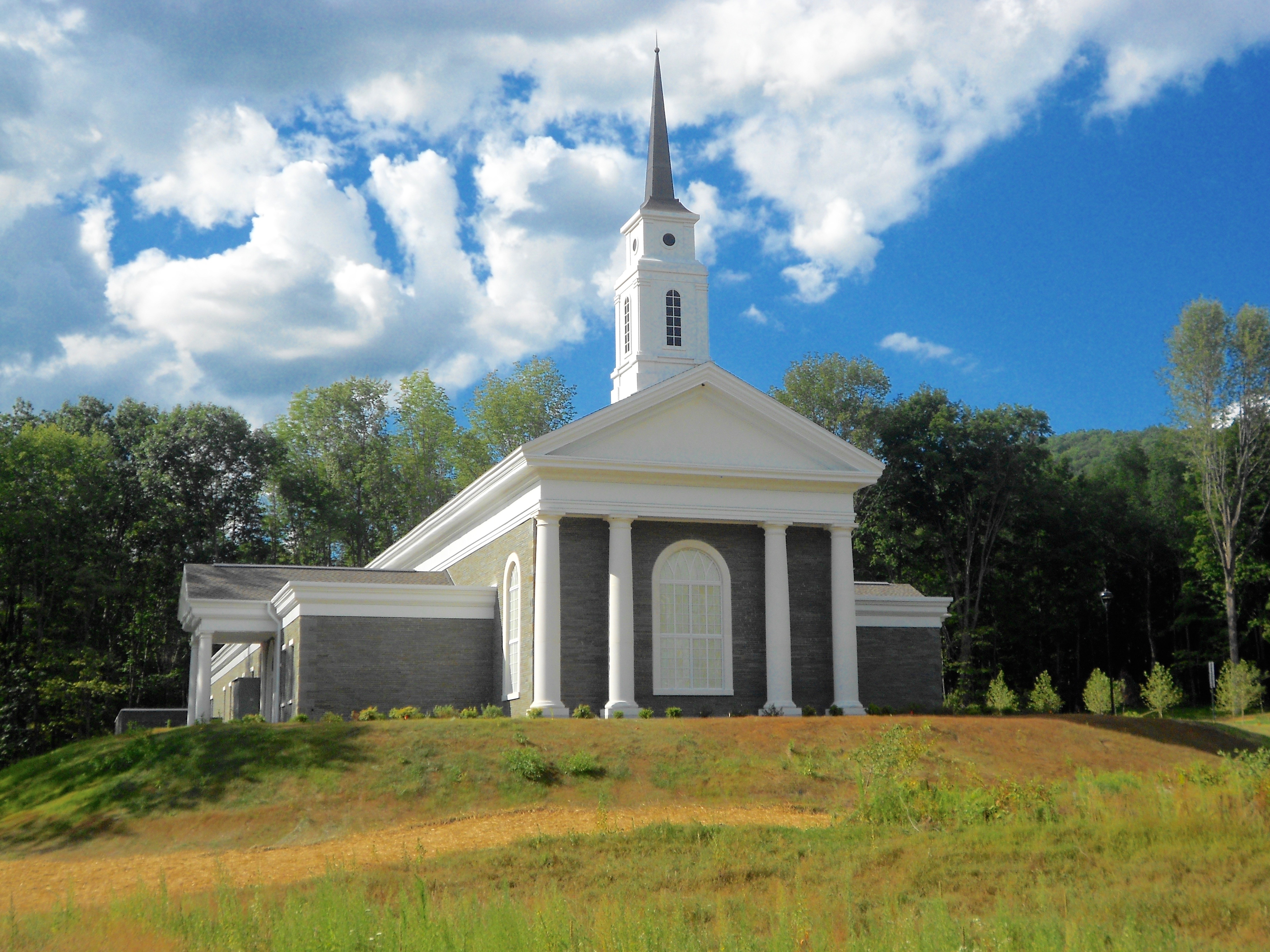
LDS meetinghouse on the site shortly before completion

In a letter dated April 15, 2011, the church announced that the site would be restored. The project included reconstructing the homes lived in by the Smith and Hale families, improved access to the baptismal site on the Susquehanna River, the construction of a combination visitors' center and meetinghouse, and the installation of two statues near the visitors' center. These statues are reproductions of Avard Fairbanks' works Restoration of the Aaronic Priesthood and Restoration of the Melchizedek Priesthood. Pennsylvania Route 171, which splits the historic site in two, was rerouted as part of the project. In August 2015, the church announced that with construction completed, the site would be opened to the public on August 29 and was dedicated by Russell M. Nelson, the president of the Quorum of the Twelve Apostles, on September 19, 2015. Steven E. Snow, the Church Historian and Recorder from 2012 until 2019, is credited with the completion of the site.

== See also ==
- List of historic sites of The Church of Jesus Christ of Latter-day Saints
