= 91st Division Monument =

Memorial and sculpture in Fort Lewis, Washington, U.S.

Coordinates: 47°06′21″N 122°33′52″W

- Interactive map of 91st Division Monument
- Location: Fort Lewis, Washington, USA
- Designer: Avard Fairbanks

The 91st Division Monument is an outdoor monument, erected at Fort Lewis, in the U.S. state of Washington, on May 30, 1930. The memorial includes six statues designed by Avard Fairbanks and a 40-foot (12 m) shaft designed by architect John Graham Sr.
