= Oaklands =

Oaklands may refer to:

Places:

- Oaklands, Carmarthenshire, Wales
- Oaklands, Gauteng, a suburb of Johannesburg, South Africa
- Oaklands, Hertfordshire, England
- Oaklands, New South Wales, a town in Australia
- Oaklands, New Zealand, a suburb of Christchurch, New Zealand
- Oaklands, County Tyrone, a townland in County Tyrone, Northern Ireland
- Oaklands, a neighbourhood of Victoria, British Columbia in Canada

Institutions:

- Oaklands College, in Hertfordshire, England
- Oaklands Catholic School, in Hampshire, England

Historic houses:

- Oaklands (Gardiner, Maine)
- Oaklands (Laurel, Maryland)
- Oaklands (West Whiteland Township, Pennsylvania)
- Oaklands, a plantation estate in Murfreesboro, Tennessee, now operated as Oaklands Historic House Museum
- Oaklands (Toronto), a former mansion that is now part of De La Salle College in Toronto, Canada
- Oaklands, Pambula, a heritage house in New South Wales, Australia

Related names:

- Oaklands Cemetery, in West Goshen Township, Pennsylvania
- Oaklands Park, South Australia
- Oaklands Junction, suburb of Melbourne, Australia
- Oaklands railway station, Adelaide, South Australia

== See also ==
- Oakland (disambiguation)
