= Oakland Avenue Historic District =

Historic district in Rhode Island, United States

- U.S. National Register of Historic Places
- U.S. Historic district
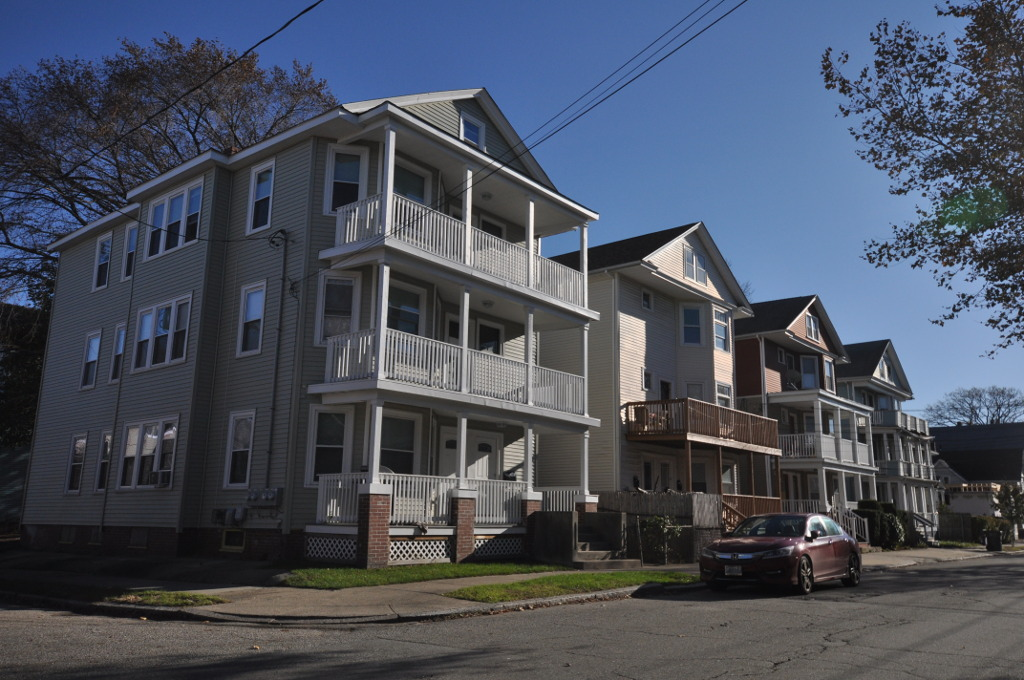

- Location within Rhode Island Location within the United States
- Location: Providence, Rhode Island
- Coordinates: 41°50′20″N 71°25′46″W
- NRHP reference No.: 84000378
- Added to NRHP: November 1, 1984

The Oakland Avenue Historic District is a residential historic district in the Smith Hill neighborhood of Providence, Rhode Island, USA. The area is a densely built stretch of Oakland and Pembroke Avenues, extending from Eaton Street in the north to about half-way between Chad Brown Street and Smith Street in the south. Only buildings on the east side of Pembroke are included, while both sides of Oakland Avenue are, as are a few properties on adjacent roads. All but two of the 110 buildings in the district are residential, and are set on small lots of similar size. The houses are almost all multi-unit, housing either two or three units, and were built in between 1890 and 1930. The district represents a dense and well-preserved collection of this type of housing in the city, and was one of its last "inner city" areas to be developed.

The district was added to the National Register of Historic Places in 1984.

== See also ==
- National Register of Historic Places listings in Providence, Rhode Island
