= Peter M. Fillerup =

American sculptor

- Born: September 4, 1953; Cody, Wyoming, U.S.
- Died: August 2016 (aged 62)
- Education: Brigham Young University–Idaho; Brigham Young University
- Occupation: Sculptor
- Spouse: Lisa Ottesen
- Children: 1 son, 5 daughters

Peter M. Fillerup (September 4, 1953 - August 2016) was an American sculptor. A member of the Church of Jesus Christ of Latter-day Saints, he attended Brigham Young University–Idaho and Brigham Young University in Provo. He was trained by Utah sculptor Avard Fairbanks. He designed a sculpture of Porter Rockwell, who served on the Council of Fifty, as well as lighting fixtures for 20 LDS temples, including the Payson Utah Temple and the Lima Peru Temple. In 1997, he designed the Hilda Erickson Memorial Statue, a public statue in memory of all American pioneers in Grantsville, Utah.

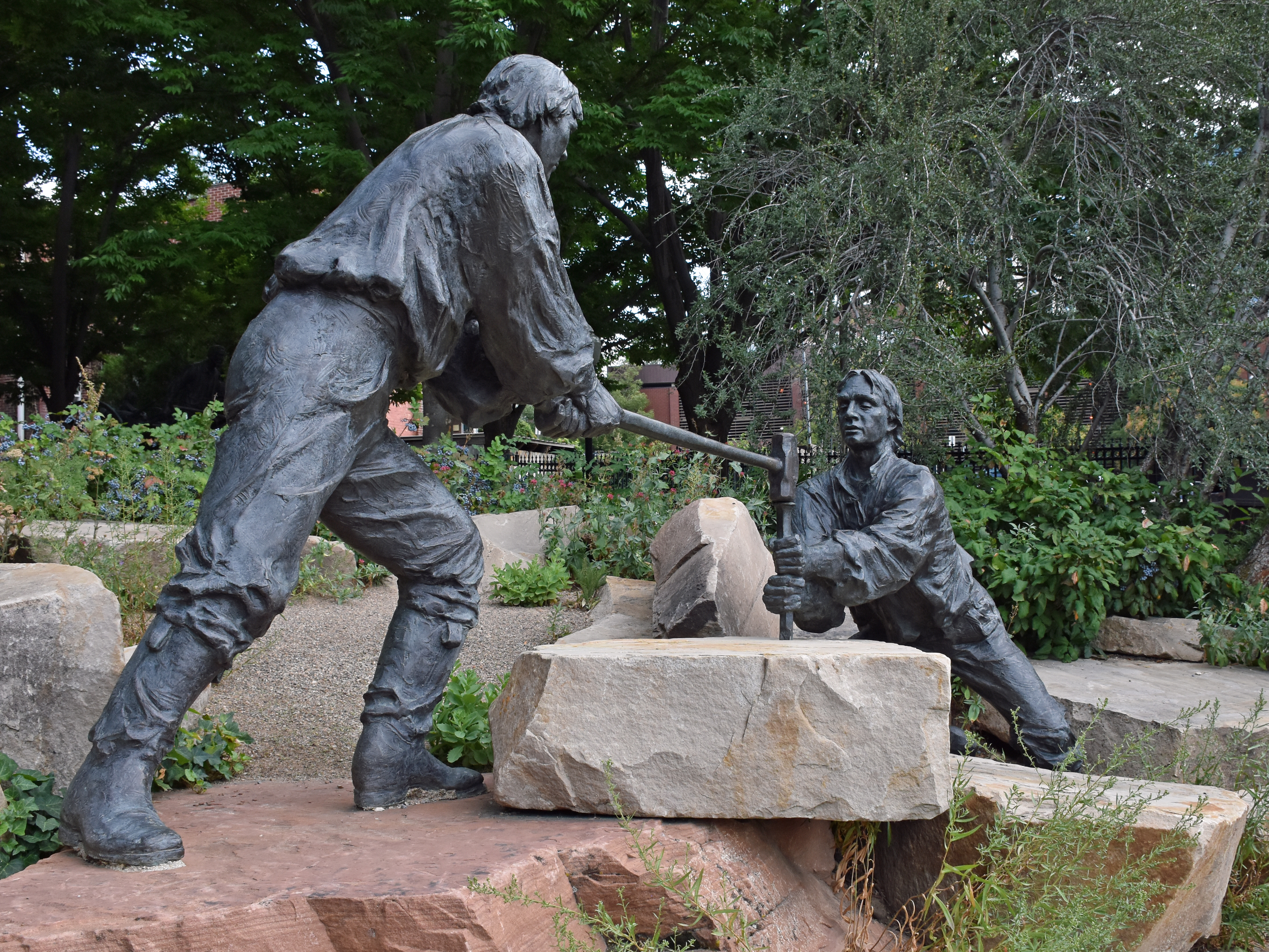
Fillerup's The Quarry in the Brigham Young Historic Park

Major Sculptures:

- 1978 "Buffalo Bill the Showman" bronze Buffalo Bill Historical Center Cody, Wyoming and Buffalo Bill Museum Golden, Colorado
- 1979 "Porter Rockwell" bronze LDS Church Museum Salt Lake City, Utah
- 1981 "Liver-Eating Johnson" bronze Johnson gravesite Cody, Wyoming
- 1982 "Christus" marble Biblical Arts Center Dallas, Texas
- 1982 "Rough String" marble Century America Orange, California
- 1984 "Jay hawk" bronze University of Kansas Lawrence, Kansas
- 1985 "Scouting- Road to Manhood" bronze Philmont Boy Scout Ranch Cimarron, New Mexico
- 1985 "Scouting-Road to Manhood" bronze Boulder Dam Area Council Las Vegas, Nevada
- 1985 "Scouting-Road to Manhood" bronze Central Wyoming Council Casper, Wyoming
- 1986 "Kit Carson" bronze Salt Lake County Building Sale Lake City, Utah
- 1987 "Up Front" bronze Soldiers and Sailors Home Buffalo, Wyoming
- 1989 "Sower of the Good Seed" bronze Christ Church Chicago, Illinois
- 1990 "Fanning a Twister- Steamboat" bronze University of Wyoming Laramie, Wyoming
- 1991 "Restoration of the Aaronic Priesthood" bronze LDS Relief Society Bldg. Salt Lake City, Utah
- 1994 "The Swimming Hole" bronze Brigham Young Historic Park
- 1994 "The Gardner's" bronze Brigham Young Historic Park
- 1994 "Repairing the Flume" bronze Brigham Young Historic Park
- 1994 "The Quarry" bronze Brigham Young Historic Park
- 1995 "Pioneer Gardner's" bronze Ramah History Museum Ramah, New Mexico
- 1996 "Journey's End" bronze Heber City Park Heber, Utah
- 1996 "Hilda Erickson" bronze Grantsville City Hall Grantsville, Utah
- 1997 "Pioneer Family" bronze Heber Tabernacle Heber, Utah
- 1998 "Pioneer Family" bronze Tooele Public Library Tooele, Utah
- 1999 "Noah's Ark" bronze Thanksgiving Point Lehi, Utah
- 1999 "Chief Washakie" bronze LDS Conference Center Salt Lake City, Utah
- 2000 "Miner" bronze Park City Museum Park City, Utah
- 2001 "Cael Sanderson" bronze Wasatch High School Heber, Utah
- 2002 "Olympic Snowflake" stainless steel Olympic Plaza Midway, Utah
- 2003 "Russ McDonald" bronze McDonald Field Airport Heber, Utah
- 2004 "Horse Fountain" bronze Private Residence Midway, Utah
- 2005 "Bear Crossing" bronze Private Residence Jackson Hole, Wyoming
- 2006 "Baden Powell" bronze LDS BSA Relations National Jamboree
- 2007 "The Summit" bronze & steel City of Ogden Recreation Ogden, Utah
- 2008 "Two Eskimo Boys" bronze Sitnasauk Native Corporation Nome, Alaska
- 2008 "Derrick Family" bronze Derrick Residence Farmington, Utah
- 2009 "Bud Wright-Park bronze Park City Museum
- 2009 "City Skier" Park City, Utah
- 2010 "Hard and Fast All the Way" bronze Buffalo Bill Historical Center Cody, Wyoming
- 2011 "Hard and Fast All the Way" bronze Cabela's Headquarters Sidney, Nebraska
- 2011 "The Sentinel" bronze Springville Civic Center Springville, Utah
- 2012 "Hard and Fast All the Way" bronze Redstone Park City, Utah
- 2013 "Flight to Manhood" bronze Summit Bechtel National Scout Reserve West Virginia

Selected Commercial and Public Projects:

- AmBank Heber, Utah
- Bill's Pub North Chicago, Illinois
- Camp Cloud Rim Girl Scout Ranch Park City, Utah
- Central Wyoming Council BSA Casper, Wyoming
- Great American Restaurants Manassas and Falls Church, Virginia
- Heber Valley Railroad Depot Heber, Utah
- Key Bank New York, New York
- Marabou Ranch Steamboat Springs, Colorado
- Maroon Creek Country Club Aspen, Colorado
- Maytag Mountain Ranch Hillside, Colorado
- Montana Grille Bowling Green, Kentucky
- National Bank of Fremont Fremont, Indiana
- National Boy Scouts of America Dallas, Texas
- Pearl Stable Convention Center San Antonio, Texas
- Philmont Scout Ranch LDS Chapel Cimarron, New Mexico
- Pinto Ranch Houston, Texas
- Pinto Ranch Retail Las Vegas, Nevada and Dallas, Texas
- Red Ledges Heber, Utah
- Stein Eriksen Lodge Deer Valley, Utah
- Storm Mountain Steamboat Springs, Colorado
- The Church of Jesus Christ of Latter-day-Saint Temples Curitiba, Brazil, Dallas, Texas, Manaus, Brazil, Payson, Utah, Tijuana, Mexico and Vancouver, B.C.
- Wyoming Governors Residence Cheyenne, Wyoming

Other Projects:

- Nolan Archibald (Black & Decker/DeWalt Tools) residence, Utah
- Wayne & Nancy Badovinus (Eddie Bauer) residence, Idaho
- Lowell Baier residence, Montana
- Ray & Christine Bingham residence, Utah
- Greg Brown (Cowboys & Indians Magazine) office, Texas
- Neil & Linda Brownstein residence, Utah
- Jay & Tamara Call (Flying J) residence, Montana
- David & Janet Cockrell residence, Wyoming
- Harlan Crowe, Camp Top Ridge, New York
- Tom Cruise residence, Colorado
- Dennis Dodson (Southeast Bell) residence, Montana
- Jeff & Gail Dyke (Dyke Associates) residence, Maine
- Michael D. Eisner (Disney) residence, Colorado
- David & Donna Elmore (E Center) residences, Utah & Montana
- Bandar bin Sultan, Ambasador, residence, Colorado
- Edsel Ford (Ford Motor Company) residence, Maine
- Kem & Caroline Gardner residence, Utah
- Rodney Haws residence, Utah
- Jon Huntsman, Sr. (former CEO Huntsman Chemical) residence, Utah
- Jeffrey Katzenburg (DreamWorks) residence, Colorado
- Neil Kaufman residence, Kentucky
- Dave Kaufman residence, Kentucky
- Robert Lee (Hunting World) residence, Montana
- John & Cindy Lovewell residence, California
- John & Vickie Miller residences, Utah & Montana
- Mount Desert Island Bar Harbour, Maine
- Ann S. O'Leary (Evergreen House Design), New York
- Bill & Jennell Presnell residence, California
- U.S. Ambassador John Price residence, Utah
- Corrine Prewitt (wife of Artist Hal Prewitt) residence, Utah
- July Pyle (Pyle Associates) residence, Colorado
- Sally & Keith Reid residence, Utah
- Dick & Sunny Reinhold (SOS Staffing) residence, Utah
- U.S. Ambassador Mercer Reynolds residence, Wyoming
- Mitt & Ann Romney residences, New Hampshire &Utah
- Kurt Roney (NuSkin) residences, Utah & Wyoming
- Blake Roney (NuSkin) residence, Utah
- Mitchel Rouse Hawkeye Ranch, Wyoming
- John Schnatter (Papa John's Pizza) residence, Kentucky
- Steve & Shannon Sorensen residence, California
- Bill & Joanne Shiebler (Asset Publishing) residences, Wyoming & Utah
- L.E. Simmons residence, Texas
- Harris Simmons (Zions Bank) residence, Utah
- R. M. Stern (R.M. Stern Architects) residence, New York
- Glenn & Wendy Stearns residence, Wyoming
- Bruce Talkington (Disney-Winnie the Pooh) residence, Utah
- George & Wanda Tomlin, Tennessee
- Jody Thompson (7-11 Stores) residence, Texas
- Robert & Heather Urich residence, Utah
- Chad & Wendy Weiss residence, Wyoming
- Paul Allen, Residence, Washington
