= Oakland, Bracken County, Kentucky =

Unincorporated community in Kentucky, United States

Oakland
- Unincorporated community
- Location within the state of Kentucky Oakland (the United States)
- Coordinates: 38°37′18″N 84°4′4″W
- Country: United States
- State: Kentucky
- County: Bracken
- Elevation: 807 ft (246 m)
- Time zone: UTC-5 (Eastern (EST))
  - Summer (DST): UTC-4 (EDT)
- GNIS feature ID: 2362837

Oakland is an unincorporated community located in Bracken County, Kentucky, United States.

Oakland most likely was named for a grove of oak trees near the original town site.
