= Auckland, California =

Unincorporated community in California, United States

- Unincorporated community
- Location within California Location within the United States
- Coordinates: 36°35′17″N 119°06′24″W
- Country: United States
- State: California
- County: Tulare
- Elevation: 1,280 ft (390 m)
- Time zone: UTC-8 (Pacific (PST))
  - Summer (DST): UTC-7 (PDT)
- Area code: 559
- GNIS feature ID: 1657965

Auckland is an unincorporated community in Tulare County, California, United States. Auckland is located on California State Route 245, 12 miles (19 km) north of Woodlake.
