= Oakland Alternative High School =

Coordinates: 47°13′49″N 122°29′09″W

Oakland High School

Location
- 3319 S. Adams Street; Tacoma, Washington 98409; United States

Information
- School district: Tacoma Public Schools
- Principal: John Jones
- Teaching staff: 9.30 (FTE)
- Grades: 9-12
- Enrollment: 114 (2023–2024)
- Student to teacher ratio: 12.26
- Colors: Black & Green
- Mascot: Eagle
- Website: oakland.tacomaschools.org

Oakland Secondary School, originally the Oakland Alternative High School, is an alternative secondary school in Tacoma, Washington. It was built in 1912 by a prominent local architectural firm and is located at 3319 South Adams Street (South End).

== Campus ==
The school's building, designed by architect Frederick Heath and George Gove (of the Heath & Gove firm), and was built in 1912. The school served elementary students until 1988, at which time it became a high school. During 2009–10, approximately 250 students attended Oakland. OHS also added a middle school component in the 2009–10 school year.

== Curriculum ==
The curriculum at OHS is the same as any Tacoma School District's comprehensive high schools. Oakland works on a quarter system, rather than a semester system. Student earn the same number of credits at Oakland per quarter as students attending comprehensive high schools do in a semester. Oakland has a three period day vs. a six or seven period day.
