= Oaklands Catholic School =

Secondary school in England

- Schola Catholica Oaklands

Location
- Stakes Hill Road; Waterlooville, Hampshire, PO7 7BW; United Kingdom; 50°52′06″N 1°01′18″W

Information
- Type: Academy
- Motto: United by the Cross / Per Crucem Uniti
- Religious affiliation: Roman Catholic
- Established: 1966
- Founder: The Sisters of Christ
- Local authority: Hampshire
- Specialist: Humanities College
- Department for Education URN: 137345 Tables
- Ofsted: Reports
- Staff: >200
- Gender: Mixed
- Age: 11 to 19
- Enrolment: 1400
- Houses: St Catherine; St Clare; St Dominic; St Margaret; St Martin; St Stephen; St Teresa; St Vincent
- Colour: Navy Blue
- Publication: Oaklands News
- Website: https://www.oaklandscatholicschool.org/

Oaklands Catholic School and Sixth Form College is a co-educational secondary school and sixth form college with academy status located in Waterlooville, Hampshire. It opened in 1966, although its history can be traced back to 1902. Around 1400 students attend the main school with over 150 in the sixth form college. It has been a Specialist Humanities College since 2005. In the most recent inspection in July 2022, Oaklands Catholic School and Sixth Form College was rated “Good” by Ofsted, with inspectors noting the strong Catholic values, inclusive community and high standards of care.

According to the UK government school performance data for 2022 leavers, 92% of Oaklands Catholic School pupils aged 16 to 18 progressed into further education, training or employment, compared with the England average of 80%.

== History ==
Oaklands was established in Southsea as a convent school for girls (The Convent of The Cross) in 1902 by the third Roman Catholic Bishop of Portsmouth William Timothy Cotter with a group of Sisters of the Cross and Passion from Boscombe, Bournemouth. The school moved into the Oaklands estate in 1947. It had previously belonged to General Sir Charles James Napier and consisted of the land around the White House up to Purbrook Way in addition to several servant houses along Stakes Hill Road.

In 1959, the younger students moved into their own building, Holy Cross Junior School, which later became known as St Peter’s Catholic Primary School. The Convent of The Cross and St Teresa’s Portsmouth Catholic Grammar merged into Oaklands Convent School in 1966. In 1971, due to an urgent need for Catholic school places for both boys and girls, it became a voluntary-aided co-educational comprehensive school.

== Buildings ==
The school is made up of eight houses and consists of ten different blocks, each dedicated to an individual saint, often related to, or the patron of the different subjects being taught there. Three new blocks were developed (Music, Humanities, sixth form) during an extensive site improvement programme; each of these were built incorporating a Christian cross in different coloured bricks. In 2012, a major refurbishment of the Maths/Science blocks was also undertaken.

== Uniform ==
The school uniform was redesigned for the September 2009 academic year; the expense of the uniform caused criticism. A press release was issued claiming that many of the facts published by newspaper articles were incorrect, and that due to the controversy, the school would start a cheaper uniform shop.

== Notable former pupils ==
=== The Convent of the Cross ===
- Michelle Magorian, novelist

=== Oaklands Catholic School ===
- Louise Casey, Baroness Casey of Blackstock, crossbench peer and former government official
- Jonathan Cruddas, politician, Member of Parliament (MP) for Dagenham and Rainham from 2001 to 2024
- Comedians Flo and Joan (Rosie and Nicola Dempsey)
- Caroline Dinenage, politician, MP for Gosport from 2010
- Martin Montague, businessperson
- Penny Mordaunt, politician, MP for Portsmouth North from 2010 to 2024.
- James Ward-Prowse, footballer
