= Oakland Township, Mahnomen County, Minnesota =

Oakland Township, Minnesota
- Township
- Location of Oakland Township, within Mahnomen County, Minnesota

- Location within the state of Minnesota Oakland Township, Minnesota (the United States)
- Coordinates: 47°10′29″N 95°44′43″W
- Country: United States
- State: Minnesota
- County: Mahnomen

Area
  - Total: 35.4 sq mi (91.8 km^{2})
  - Land: 32.2 sq mi (83.4 km^{2})
  - Water: 3.2 sq mi (8.3 km^{2})
- Elevation: 1,493 ft (455 m)

Population (2020)
  - Total: 226
  - Density: 7.02/sq mi (2.71/km^{2})
- Time zone: UTC-6 (Central (CST))
  - Summer (DST): UTC-5 (CDT)
- FIPS code: 27-47806
- GNIS feature ID: 0665189

Oakland Township is a township in Mahnomen County, Minnesota, United States. The population was 226 at the 2020 census.

== Geography ==
According to the United States Census Bureau, the township has a total area of 35.4 square miles (91.8 km^{2}), of which 32.2 square miles (83.4 km^{2}) of it is land and 3.2 square miles (8.3 km^{2}) of it (9.09%) is water.

== Demographics ==
As of the census of 2000, there were 260 people, 100 households, and 76 families residing in the township. The population density was 8.1 people per square mile (3.1/km^{2}). There were 155 housing units at an average density of 4.8/sq mi (1.9/km^{2}). The racial makeup of the township was 72.31% White, 21.54% Native American, and 6.15% from two or more races. Hispanic or Latino of any race were 0.38% of the population.

There were 100 households, out of which 35.0% had children under the age of 18 living with them, 60.0% were married couples living together, 5.0% had a female householder with no husband present, and 24.0% were non-families. 21.0% of all households were made up of individuals, and 3.0% had someone living alone who was 65 years of age or older. The average household size was 2.60 and the average family size was 2.88.

In the township the population was spread out, with 27.3% under the age of 18, 9.2% from 18 to 24, 28.1% from 25 to 44, 24.6% from 45 to 64, and 10.8% who were 65 years of age or older. The median age was 38 years. For every 100 females, there were 128.1 males. For every 100 females age 18 and over, there were 122.4 males.

The median income for a household in the township was $43,333, and the median income for a family was $42,917. Males had a median income of $32,679 versus $22,250 for females. The per capita income for the township was $16,193. About 9.5% of families and 8.9% of the population were below the poverty line, including 9.5% of those under the age of eighteen and 17.4% of those 65 or over.
