= Avard Fairbanks =

American sculptor (1897–1987)

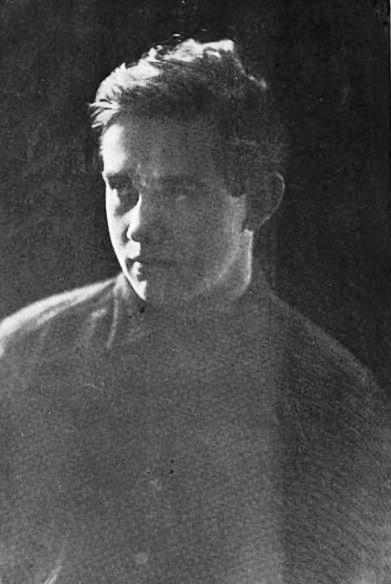
- Fairbanks (c. 1914)
- Born: Avard Tennyson Fairbanks; March 2, 1897; Provo, Utah, US
- Died: January 1, 1987 (aged 89); Salt Lake City, Utah, US
- Resting place: Larkin Sunset Lawn Cemetery; 40.741°N 111.823°W
- Education: University of Michigan
- Occupation: Sculptor
- Spouse: Beatrice M. Fox
- Parent: John B Fairbanks

Avard Tennyson Fairbanks (March 2, 1897 – January 1, 1987) was a 20th-century American sculptor. Over his eighty-year career, he sculpted over 100 public monuments and hundreds of artworks. Fairbanks is known for his religious-themed commissions for the Church of Jesus Christ of Latter-day Saints (LDS Church) including the Three Witnesses, Tragedy of Winter Quarters, and several Angel Moroni sculptures on spires of the church's temples. Additionally, Fairbanks sculpted over a dozen Abraham Lincoln-themed sculptures and busts among which the most well-known reside in the U.S. Supreme Court Building and Ford's Theatre Museum.

From a young age, Fairbanks was a talented artist. At 13 years old, he attended the Art Students League of New York on scholarship and his work was displayed at the National Academy of Design a year later. In 1913, he studied abroad in Paris at the École nationale supérieure des Beaux-Arts where he was the youngest student admitted to the French salons. He taught sculpture at several universities and attended medical school at the University of Michigan where he earned a doctorate in anatomical studies in order to better represent the human body in his art.

== Life ==
=== Early life and education ===
Avard Tennyson Fairbanks was born on March 2, 1897, in Provo, Utah. He was the last and eleventh child of the artist John B Fairbanks and Lilly Annetta Huish. Fairbanks was introduced to art by his father and his brother, John Leo Fairbanks. His first piece of art was a small, clay rabbit that won first prize in the 1909 Utah State Fair. However, after the judge learned of Fairbanks's young age, he revoked the prize. Fairbanks joined his father in New York City to copy art pieces at the Metropolitan Museum, where he was reluctantly received by the curators due to his inexperience. However, he showed great skill and was called a "young Michelangelo" by the New York Herald, which led to other commissions such as animal models for the Bronx Zoological Gardens. There, he was instructed by Anna Hyatt Huntington and Charles R. Knight.

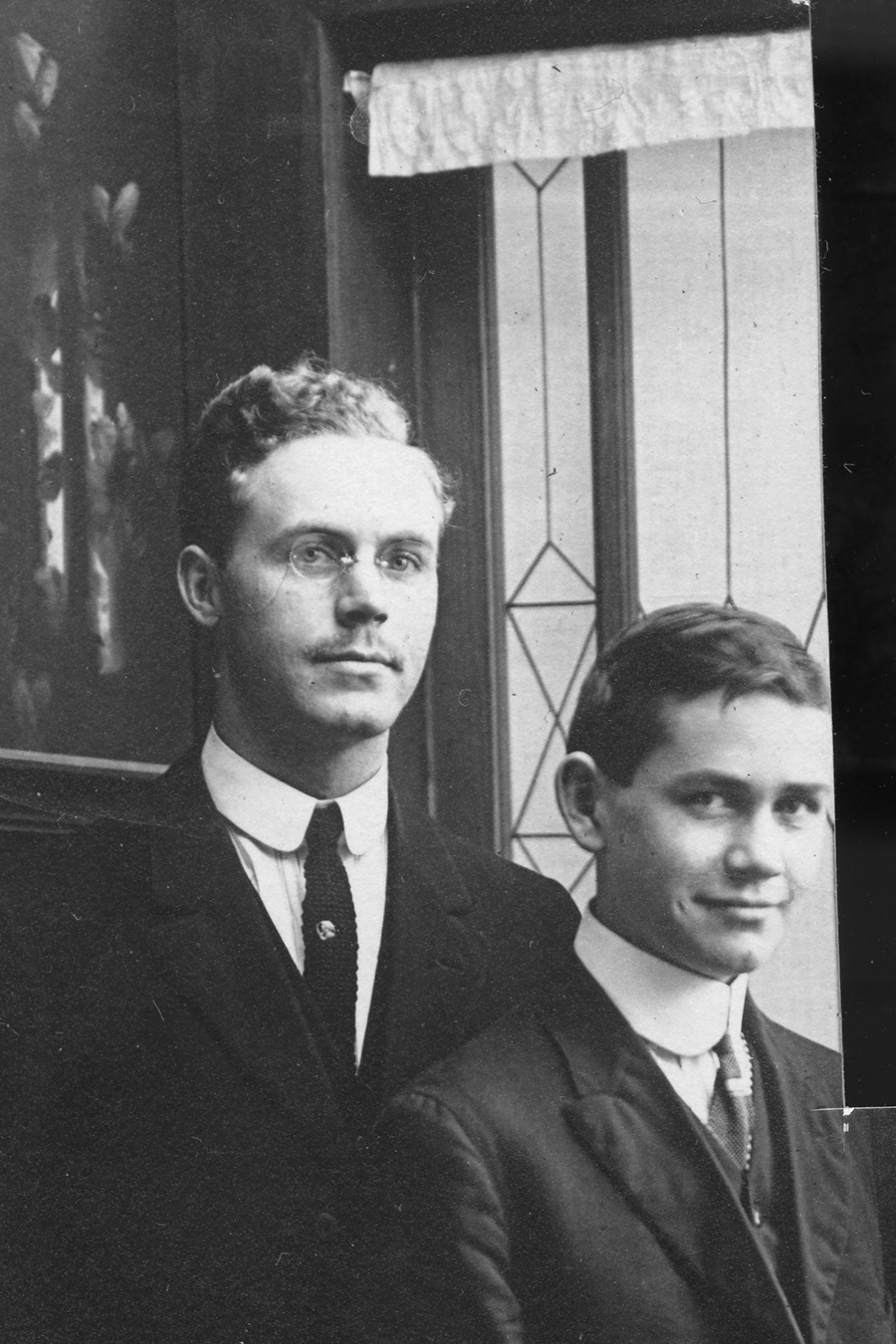
Older brother, John Leo Fairbanks, and younger brother, Avard Tennyson Fairbanks, 1912 in New York City, while Avard was studying art

He attended the Art Students League of New York on scholarship at age 13, instructed by James Earle Fraser. By the age of 14, his art was displayed at the National Academy of Design. He returned to Utah after 18 months studying in New York, to prepare to study art abroad. Fairbanks and his father tried to obtain as many commissions as possible to pay for his study abroad. Among these commissions was a lion he sculpted out of butter for the Utah State Fair, channeling the butter sculpture fable of Antonio Canova. This sculpture attracted a large audience and was well received.

In 1913, Fairbanks studied at the École nationale supérieure des Beaux-Arts in Paris, instructed by Jean Antoine Injalbert. Additionally, he studied at the Académie de la Grande Chaumière, the Académie Colarossi, and the École Moderne. He became the youngest student admitted to the French Salon; however, his studies were cut short due to World War I. Fairbanks and his father escaped Europe on the last train out of Paris and the last spots available on the boat Ansonia leaving Liverpool, returning to New York with only fifteen cents between the two of them.

=== Career ===
After returning from Paris, Fairbanks continued his artistry in Utah, focusing on clay modeling while completing high school. Some of his pieces were displayed in the Panama–Pacific International Exposition in the Palace of Fine Arts. In 1915, he received his first major commission sculpting statues and an elaborate frieze on the Laie Hawaii Temple for the LDS Church with his brother, J. Leo. His romantic interest, Beatrice Maude Fox, from Taylorsville, Utah, joined him in Hawaii. They married on June 25, 1918, in Honolulu, Hawaii. After the project was finished in 1918, Fairbanks and Fox returned to Utah, where he enrolled at the University of Utah (U of U). Due to his extensive artistic training, he took other academic courses and did not complete course study in art.

In 1920, he became an assistant professor of art at the University of Oregon, teaching sculpture. Fairbanks took a sabbatical to study at Yale University, earning a Bachelor of Fine Arts degree and returned to instruct at University of Oregon. Fairbanks was offered a Guggenheim Fellowship to study art in Europe. Bringing his wife and four children along, he studied in England, France, and Italy; however, he spent most of his time in Florence, Italy. Fairbanks studied underneath Dante Sodini. He created work for Arciconfraternita della Misericordia during this time as well as sculptures in the theme of spring and motherhood. When Fairbanks returned in 1928, he taught a summer class at Seattle Art Museum. In 1929, he received a Master of Fine Arts degree from the University of Washington, where he would construct the 91st Division Monument. In 1933, Fairbanks, joined by his father and brother, created the Mormon Display for the Columbian Exposition in Chicago. Fairbanks sculpted, his brother made stained glass, and his father painted. Fairbanks and his family moved to Ann Arbor, Michigan where he attended medical school, earning MA and Ph.D. degrees in Anatomy in 1933 and 1936 respectively from the University of Michigan. He did this in order to better and more accurately represent the human body in his work. He began to use anatomical techniques in his subsequent artworks. He was appointed professor of sculpture at the University of Michigan in 1930 and taught sculpture there until 1948. While Fairbanks was living in Ann Arbor, he served for a time as the president of the branch of the LDS Church there.

In 1947, Fairbanks created the Fine Arts Department at the U of U. He served as dean and professor of Fine Art at the College of Fine Arts at the U of U from 1948 to 1955. He retired as dean in 1955, but continued teaching at the U of U for 10 years. At the U of U, his conservative philosophy was that "modern abstraction was part of an international communist conspiracy." In 1965, he became a resident sculptor, fine arts consultant, and lecturer at the University of North Dakota (UND). After working at UND, Fairbanks retired, spending the rest of his life creating commissioned works. Fairbanks died in Salt Lake City on January 1, 1987.

== Works ==
=== Religious ===
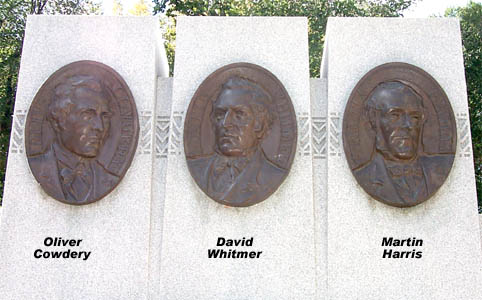
Three Witnesses Monument, by Avard Fairbanks

Fairbanks sculpted the statues of the Angel Moroni for the LDS Church on the Washington, D.C., Denver Colorado, Jordan River Utah, Mexico City Mexico, Seattle Washington, and São Paulo Brazil temples. Fairbanks also sculpted Tragedy of Winter Quarters in the Mormon Pioneer Cemetery at the Winter Quarters Historical Site. This project was particularly meaningful to him because his ancestors suffered at Winter Quarters when it was an encampment.

Many of the sculptures on Temple Square in Salt Lake City are by Fairbanks, including the Three Witnesses Monument. In 1957, his work Restoration of the Aaronic Priesthood was added to Temple Square; a relief version of this sculpture was added to the Priesthood Restoration Site in 1960. A companion piece, Restoration of the Melchizedek Priesthood, was also created for Temple Square and was displayed in the Mormon Pavilion at the 1964 New York World's Fair.

Although most of his later work was free-standing sculptures, Fairbanks did create several friezes for the Harold B. Lee Library on the Brigham Young University campus.

=== Historical ===
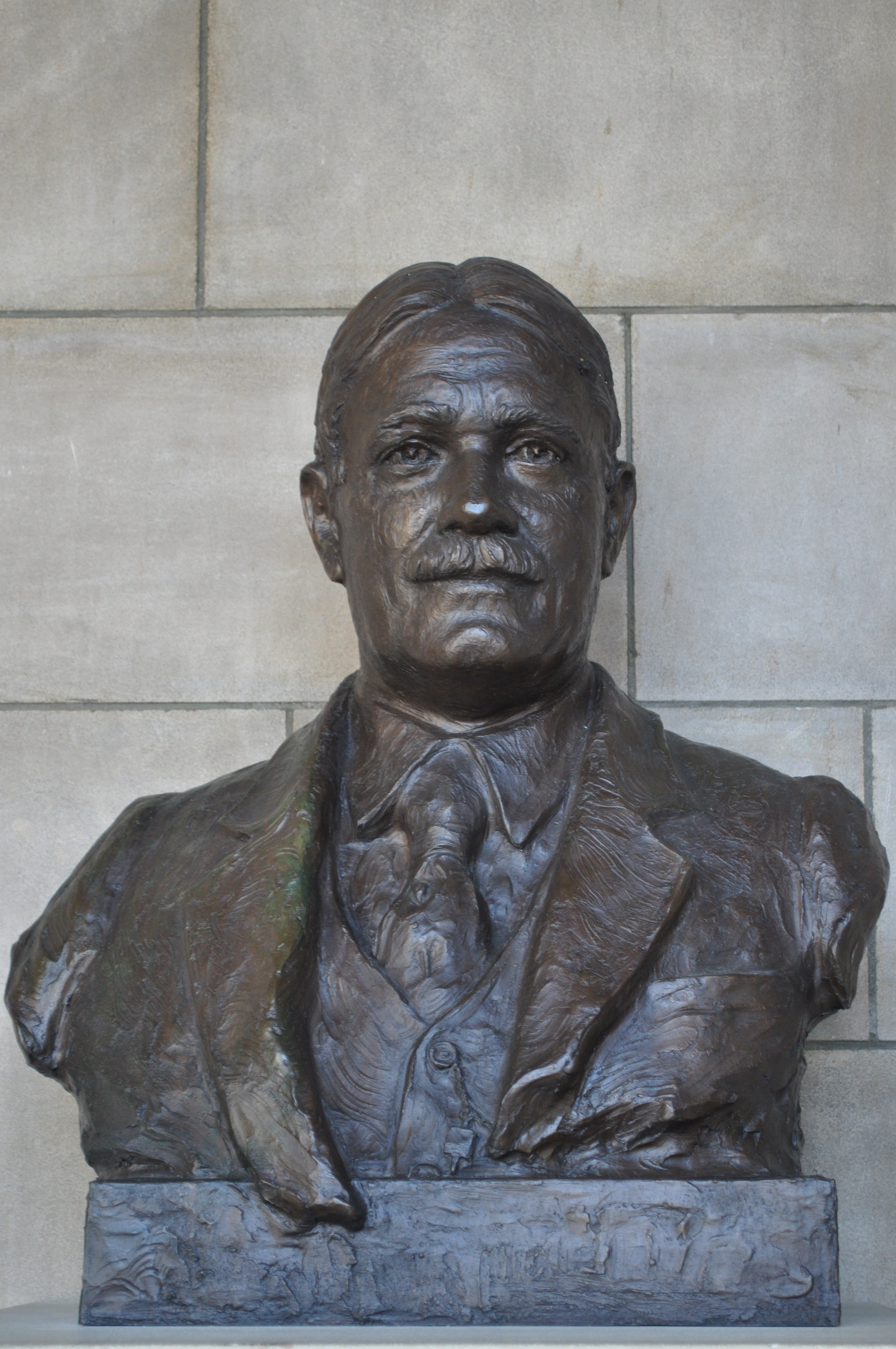
Bust of Roscoe Pound created by Fairbanks in 1981 for the Nebraska Hall of Fame

In the 1920s, Fairbanks sculpted the St. Anthony's Doughboy which resides in Keefer Park in Idaho. While Fairbanks was a member of the faculty of the University of Oregon, he created his Oregon Trail sculpture. Around 1925–26, he designed several bas relief panels, cast in bronze, for large doors of the United States National Bank Building in Portland. The door's panels represent ideals of American life such as "Knowledge and Service", "Domestic Welfare", and "Progress through Direction".

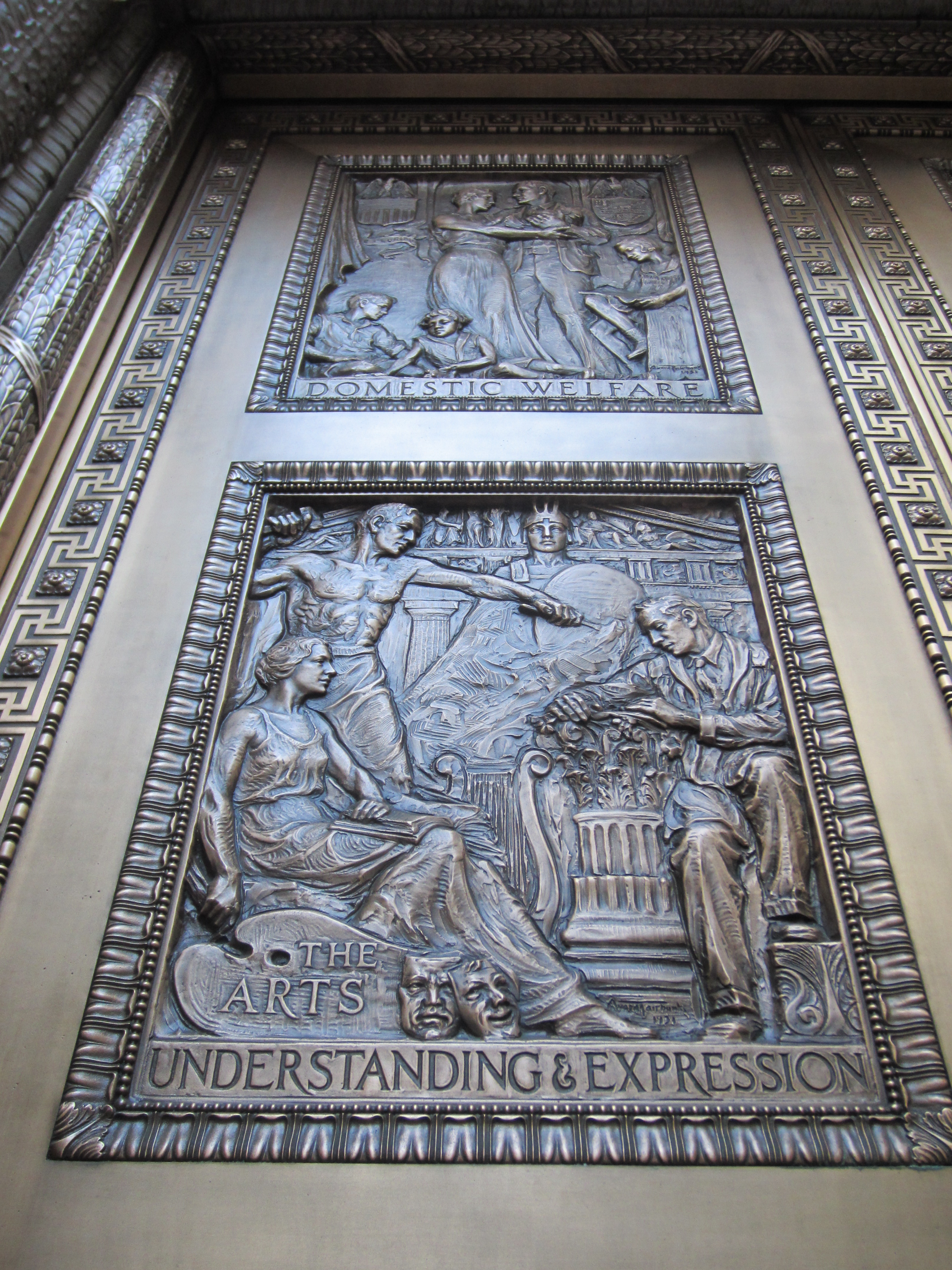
Two of several bronze-relief panels Fairbanks designed for the doors of the United States National Bank Building, in Portland, Oregon

Fairbanks made a statue of Lycurgus and was consequently knighted by King Paul of Greece. Other monuments he created include the Pony Express, Pioneer family (at the Bismarck State Capitol), Daniel Jackling (at the Utah State Capitol), and Prime Minister of Canada McKenzie King (at Ottawa Parliament buildings).

He also did multiple statues of Abraham Lincoln at Ford Theater and the U.S. Supreme Court (including The Chicago Lincoln) and The Resolute Lincoln at Lincoln's New Salem. His statue Lincoln the Friendly Neighbor, commissioned for the anniversary of Lincoln's 150th birthday in 1959 by Lincoln Federal Savings and Loan Association of Berwyn, Illinois, sits today outside of Berwyn's Lincoln Middle School.

Additionally, he designed and sculpted a George Washington statue at the Washington State Capitol Building. Other prominent figures he sculpted included John Burke, Esther Morris, and Marcus Whitman, residing in the National Capitol Building. He created the Pegasus sculpture in the northeast garden at the Meadow Brook Hall in Rochester Hills, Michigan. He also created an Ezra Meeker bust for the University of Oregon and a tabernacle door for the Altar of St. Mary's Cathedral in Eugene, Oregon. Additionally, Fairbanks constructed a 200-pound bronze medallion to commemorate the Oregon Trail. He also created a bust of Roscoe Pound in 1981 for the Nebraska Hall of Fame.

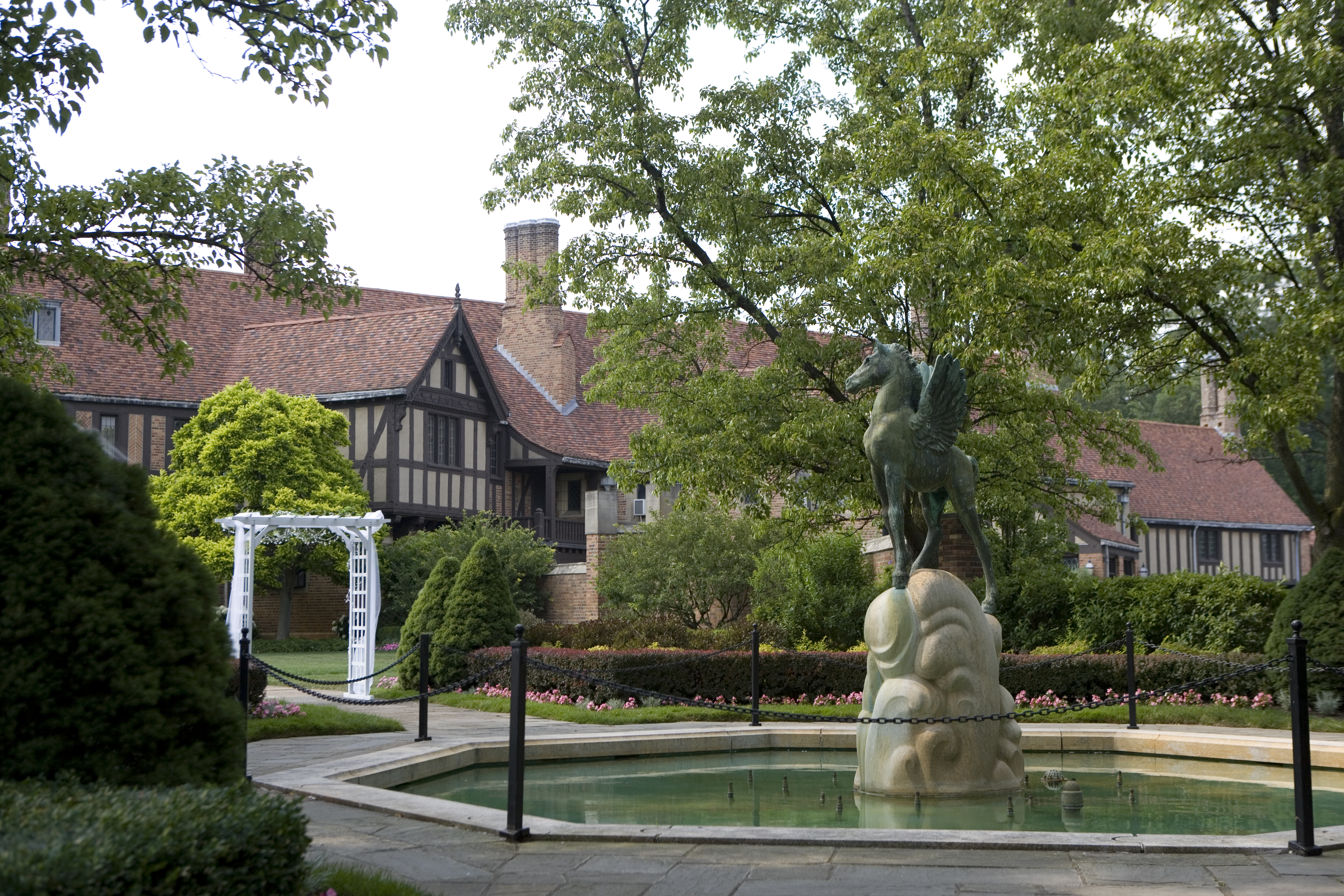
A view of Meadowbrook Hall from the northeast garden with the Pegasus sculpture by Avard Fairbanks

Three of his sculptures are in the United States Capitol, two of them in National Statuary Hall and one in a corridor; seven other statues are placed in Washington, D.C. The state capitols in Washington, North Dakota, Utah and Wyoming, as well as numerous other locations, also have his works. Possibly his most widely distributed artistic contribution was the charging ram symbol of the Dodge automobile. Other radiator ornaments he designed included the Winged Mermaid of the Plymouth and a Griffin for the Hudson automobiles.

== Family ==
Avard Fairbanks was a son of John B. Fairbanks, an artist who also had studied in Paris art academies and was briefly an art professor at Brigham Young Academy. His mother, Lilly Annetta Huish, died on May 12, 1898, about a year after he was born as a result of an injury related to a fall she had while she was carrying the fourteen-month-old Fairbanks. Avard's brother, J. Leo Fairbanks, was also an artist who had studied both painting and sculpture in the Paris art academies; Fairbanks considered his brother his first instructor and his mentor.

Fairbanks had eight biological sons. Justin served as director of the art department at Eastern Arizona University. Jonathan Leo Fairbanks was the curator of the Boston Museum of Fine Arts in the early 1990s. Jonathan served as director of art and architecture for Salt Lake City Schools until he was appointed Professor of Art and Chairman of the Art Department at Oregon State University in Corvallis, Oregon. Elliot was a dean at the College of Eastern Utah. Eugene, Virgil, David, and Grant became physicians. Avard Jr. was a physicist and inventor. His second eldest son, Eugene F. Fairbanks, compiled 10 books using archival material to illustrate his father's sculpture career. According to Abbott's book, My Return, Fairbanks also briefly served as a foster parent to Jack Henry Abbott. In 1956, after completing the Lycurgus in Sparta, Fairbanks and his wife adopted two young Greek sisters.

== Awards and honors ==
Fairbanks was a member of many organizations and societies, including National Sculpture Society, the Architectural League of New York, the International Institute of Arts and Letters, the Protetore Della Contrada Della Torre da Siena, Italy, and the Circolo Delgi Artisti di Firenzi. He was also an honorary member of the Society of Oregon Artists. Fairbanks was awarded Herbert Adams Memorial Medal by the National Sculpture Society for his contributions to American sculpture. Additionally, Paul of Greece awarded Fairbanks a medal of the Knights of Thermopylae. Fairbanks received an honorary doctorate of fine arts from Lincoln College and the Lincoln Diploma of Honor from Lincoln Memorial University. Moreover, he received the Sesquicentennial Commission of the Congress of the United States.

== See also ==
- Mormon art
- Ortho Rollin Fairbanks, nephew
