= Oakland Township, Freeborn County, Minnesota =

Township in Minnesota, United States

Oakland Township
- Township
- Location within the state of Minnesota Oakland Township (the United States)
- Coordinates: 43°38′28″N 93°7′22″W
- Country: United States
- State: Minnesota
- County: Freeborn

Area
  - Total: 36.0 sq mi (93.2 km^{2})
  - Land: 36.0 sq mi (93.2 km^{2})
  - Water: 0 sq mi (0.0 km^{2})
- Elevation: 1,250 ft (381 m)

Population (2000)
  - Total: 430
  - Density: 12/sq mi (4.6/km^{2})
- Time zone: UTC-6 (Central (CST))
  - Summer (DST): UTC-5 (CDT)
- ZIP code: 56076
- Area code: 507
- FIPS code: 27-47788
- GNIS feature ID: 0665188

Oakland Township is a township in Freeborn County, Minnesota, United States. The population was 430 at the 2000 census.

Oakland Township was organized in 1857, and named for the groves of oak within its borders.

== Geography ==
According to the United States Census Bureau, the township has a total area of 36.0 square miles (93.2 km^{2}), all land.

== Demographics ==
As of the census of 2000, there were 430 people, 155 households, and 128 families residing in the township. The population density was 11.9 people per square mile (4.6/km^{2}). There were 163 housing units at an average density of 4.5/sq mi (1.7/km^{2}). The racial makeup of the township was 97.67% White, 0.47% Asian, 0.93% from other races, and 0.93% from two or more races. Hispanic or Latino of any race were 1.86% of the population.

There were 155 households, out of which 38.7% had children under the age of 18 living with them, 74.2% were married couples living together, 6.5% had a female householder with no husband present, and 16.8% were non-families. 12.9% of all households were made up of individuals, and 7.7% had someone living alone who was 65 years of age or older. The average household size was 2.77 and the average family size was 3.02.

In the township the population was spread out, with 26.0% under the age of 18, 8.4% from 18 to 24, 27.2% from 25 to 44, 24.0% from 45 to 64, and 14.4% who were 65 years of age or older. The median age was 36 years. For every 100 females, there were 104.8 males. For every 100 females age 18 and over, there were 106.5 males.

The median income for a household in the township was $49,063, and the median income for a family was $50,962. Males had a median income of $30,250 versus $24,375 for females. The per capita income for the township was $17,611. About 6.4% of families and 7.8% of the population were below the poverty line, including 14.5% of those under age 18 and 5.4% of those age 65 or over.
