= Oakland Township, Susquehanna County, Pennsylvania =

Township in Pennsylvania, United States

- Township
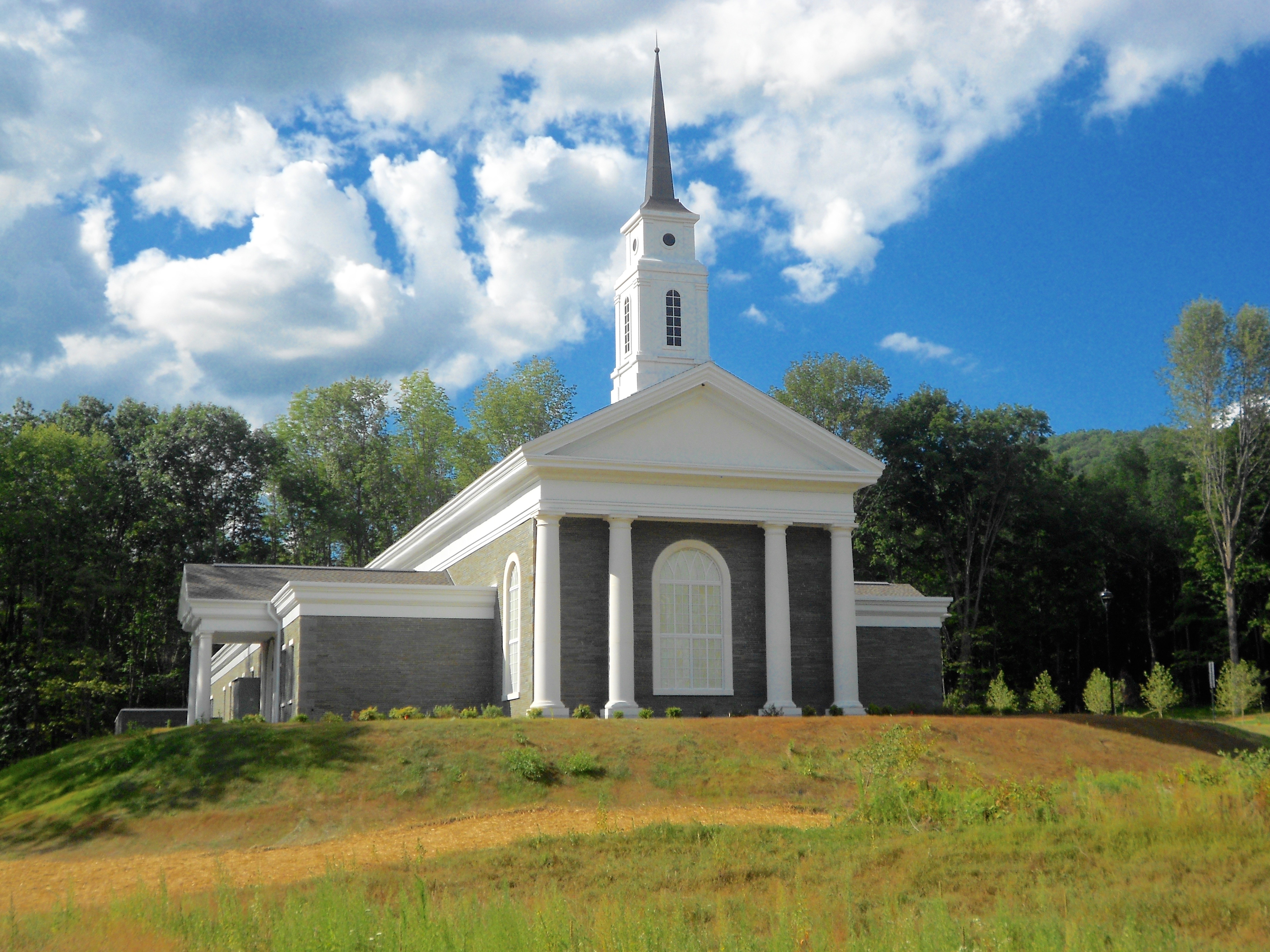
- Visitors' center for the Aaronic Priesthood Restoration Site, significant to the LDS Church

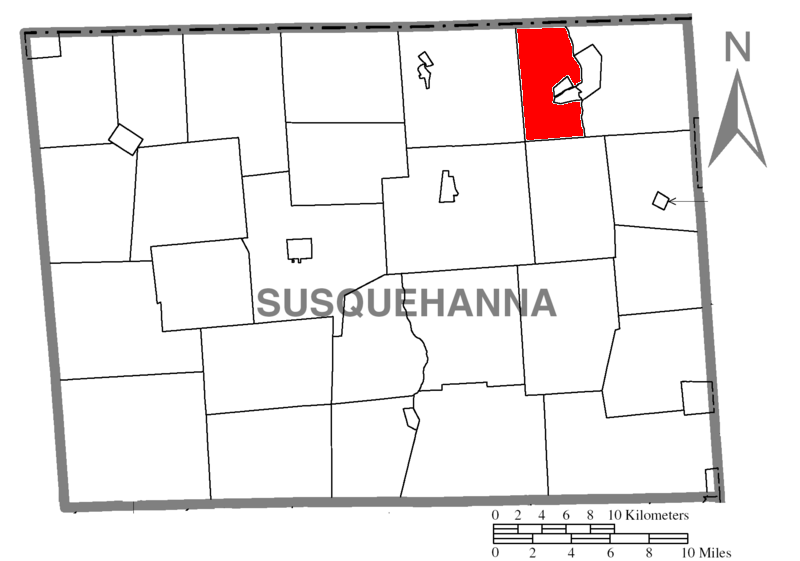

- Location of Pennsylvania in the United States
- Coordinates: 41°58′00″N 75°36′59″W
- Country: United States
- State: Pennsylvania
- County: Susquehanna
- Settled: 1787
- Incorporated: 1853

Area
  - Total: 16.74 sq mi (43.36 km^{2})
  - Land: 16.46 sq mi (42.62 km^{2})
  - Water: 0.29 sq mi (0.74 km^{2})

Population (2020)
  - Total: 492 ▼
  - Estimate (2021): 494
  - Density: 31.5/sq mi (12.18/km^{2})
- Time zone: UTC-5 (EST)
  - Summer (DST): UTC-4 (EDT)
- Area code: 570
- FIPS code: 42-115-56016

Oakland Township is a township in Susquehanna County, Pennsylvania, United States. The population was 492 at the 2020 census.

== History ==
Oakland Township was once part of Harmony Township (not to be confused with Harmony Borough in Butler County). Oakland Township was formed from the west part of Harmony Township on December 3, 1853. Oakland Borough was later incorporated from part of Oakland Township in 1883.

Emma Hale Smith, wife of Latter-day Saint Movement founder Joseph Smith, grew up in Oakland Township when it was still part of Harmony Township. During the same time, Joseph lived in Oakland Township and boarded with Emma's family while he was employed by Josiah Stowell. The Aaronic Priesthood Restoration Site preserves the location of their home.

== Geography ==
According to the United States Census Bureau, the township has a total area of 16.75 square miles (43.4 km^{2}), of which 16.45 square miles (42.6 km^{2}) is land and 0.3 square miles (0.78 km^{2}) (1.79%) is water.

== Demographics ==
Historical population
Census	Pop.	Note	%±
2010	564		—
2020	492		−12.8%
2021 (est.)	494		0.4%
U.S. Decennial Census

=== 2000 census ===
At the 2000 census there were 550 people, 227 households, and 153 families living in the township. The population density was 33.5 inhabitants per square mile (12.9/km^{2}). There were 281 housing units at an average density of 17.1/sq mi (6.6/km^{2}). The racial makeup of the township was 99.27% White, 0.36% from other races, and 0.36% from two or more races. Hispanic or Latino of any race were 1.45%.

Of the 227 households 30.8% had children under the age of 18 living with them, 53.7% were married couples living together, 7.5% had a female householder with no husband present, and 32.2% were non-families. 26.4% of households were one person and 12.3% were one person aged 65 or older. The average household size was 2.42 and the average family size was 2.86.

The age distribution was 24.4% under the age of 18, 6.4% from 18 to 24, 24.5% from 25 to 44, 26.5% from 45 to 64, and 18.2% 65 or older. The median age was 41 years. For every 100 females there were 102.2 males. For every 100 females age 18 and over, there were 97.2 males.

The median household income was $28,438 and the median family income was $38,750. Males had a median income of $29,688 versus $22,321 for females. The per capita income for the township was $15,820. About 9.4% of families and 17.0% of the population were below the poverty line, including 24.6% of those under age 18 and 6.1% of those age 65 or over.

=== 2010 census ===
As of the census of 2010, there were 564 people, 232 households, and 161 families living in the township. The population density was 34.3 inhabitants per square mile (13.2/km^{2}). There were 285 housing units at an average density of 17.3/sq mi (6.8/km^{2}). The racial makeup of the township was 96.3% White, 0.5% Black, 0.5% American Indian, 1.2% Asian, 0.2% Pacific Islander, and 1.2% from two or more races. Hispanic or Latino of any race were 1.2% of the population.

Of the 232 households 26.3% had children under the age of 18 living with them, 53.9% were married couples living together, 7.3% had a female householder with no husband present, and 30.6% were non-families. 25.9% of households were one person and 14.2% were one person aged 65 or older. The average household size was 2.43 and the average family size was 2.85.

The age distribution was 20% under the age of 18, 60.9% from 18 to 64, and 19.1% 65 or older. The median age was 47 years.

The median household income was $55,865 and the median family income was $63,417. Males had a median income of $40,599 versus $24,333 for females. The per capita income for the township was $25,326. About 3.6% of families and 7.4% of the population were below the poverty line, including 10.9% of those under age 18 and none of those age 65 or over.
