= Irish Cross (Salt Lake City) =

Sculpture in Salt Lake City, Utah, U.S.

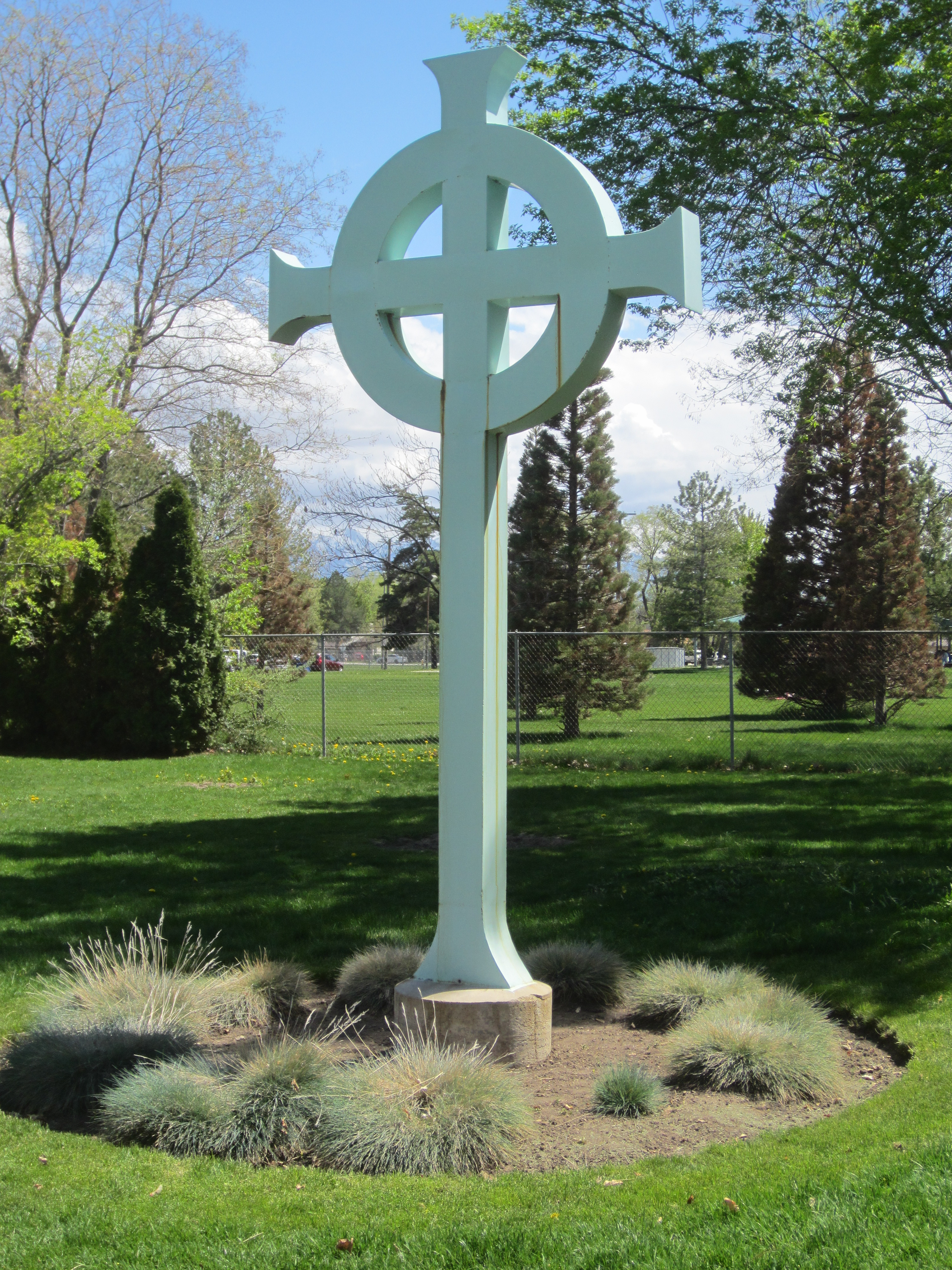
- The sculpture in 2021
- Year: 1989
- Medium: Steel sculpture
- Dimensions: 370 cm × 150 cm × 20 cm (144 in × 60 in × 8 in)
- Location: Salt Lake City, Utah, United States
- 40°44′49.1″N 111°55′14.6″W

Irish Cross is a sculpture by an unknown artist, installed in Salt Lake City, Utah, United States.

== Description ==
The steel sculpture of a Celtic cross represents Ireland in Jordan Park's International Peace Gardens. It measures approximately 12 ft. x 5 ft. x 8 in., and rests on a concrete base which is approximately 10 in. tall and has a 24-inch diameter.

== History ==
The sculpture was dedicated on September 30, 1989, and is meant to symbolize eternity, everlasting power, and glory. It is modeled after ancient crosses in Ireland, which stood to honor individuals of historical importance. The artwork was surveyed by the Smithsonian Institution's "Save Outdoor Sculpture!" program in 1994.
