= Olmec Head Replica =

Sculpture in Salt Lake City, Utah, U.S.

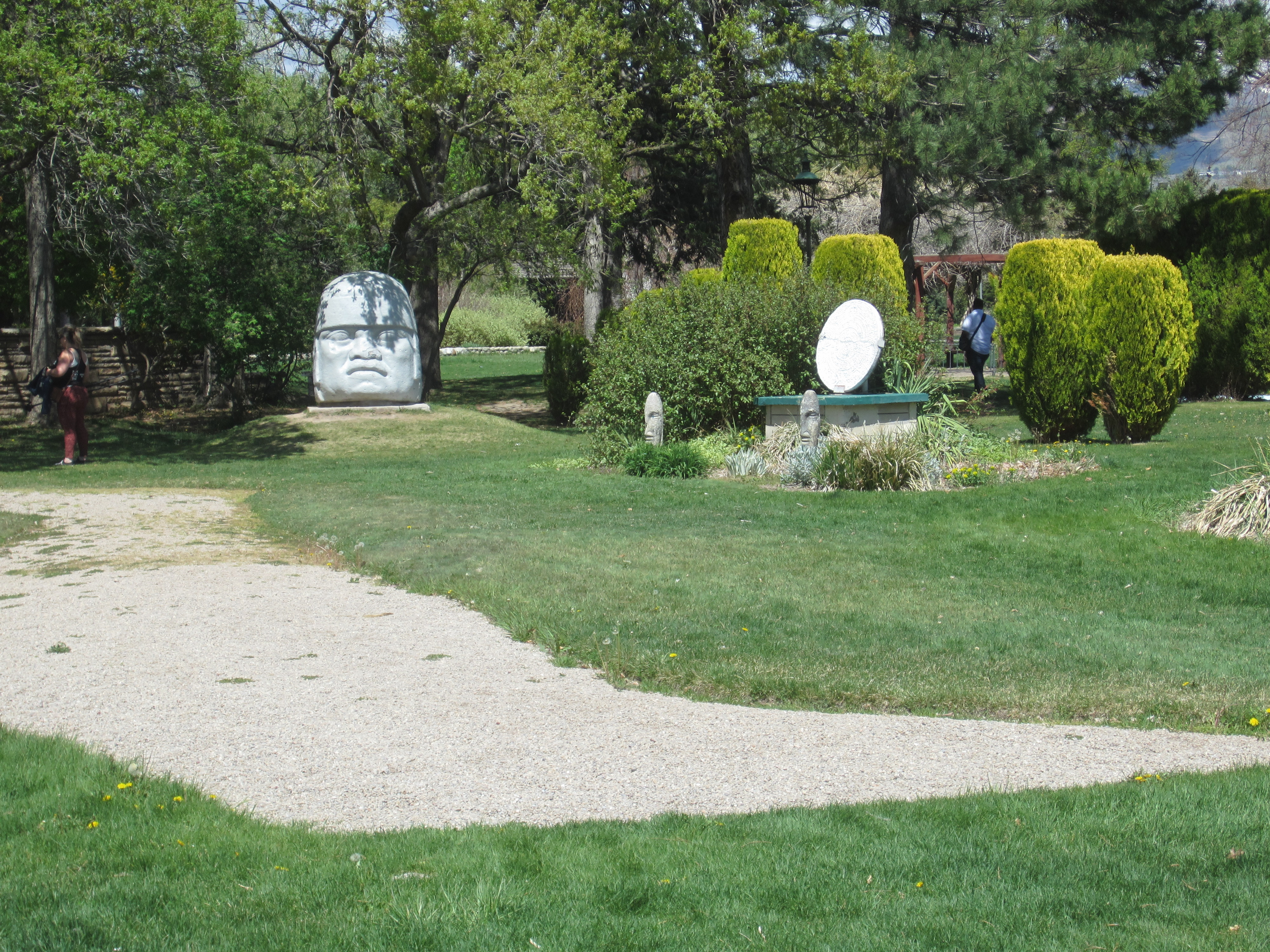
- The sculpture in Jordan Park's International Peace Gardens, 2021
- Medium: Limestone sculpture
- Location: Salt Lake City, Utah, U.S.
- 40°44′50.7″N 111°55′16.5″W

Olmec Head Replica is installed in Salt Lake City, Utah, United States.

== Description and history ==
The grey limestone sculpture represents Mexico in Jordan Park's International Peace Gardens. It measures approximately 5.5 x 4.5 x 3.5 ft and rests on a cement and concrete base which measures approximately 4 in. x 5 ft. x 4 ft. The replica was surveyed by the Smithsonian Institution's "Save Outdoor Sculpture!" program in 1994.

== See also ==
- Olmec colossal heads
- Olmec Head, Number 8
