= Spirit Poles =

1985 art installation in Salt Lake City, Utah, U.S.

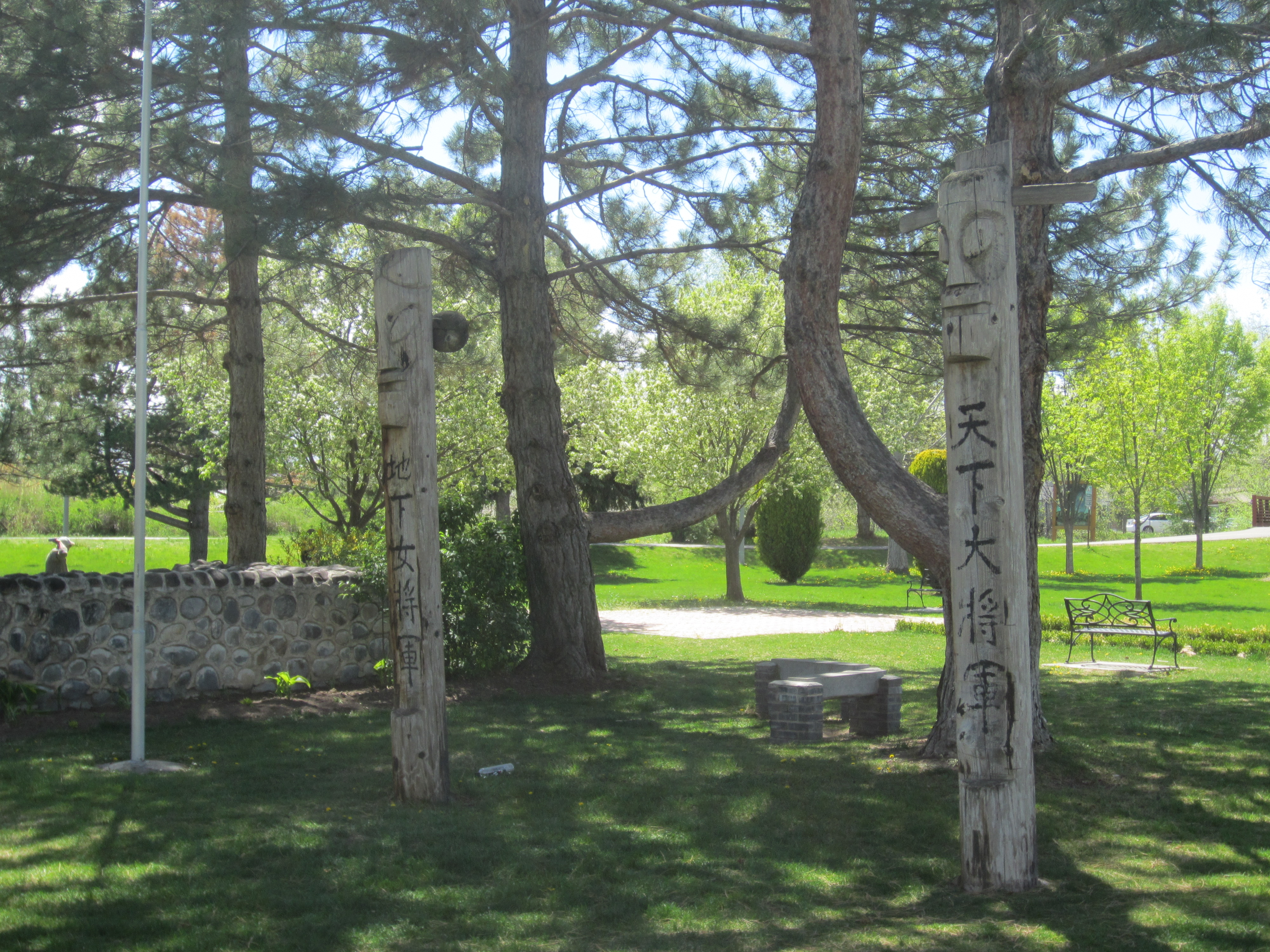
- The artwork in 2021
- Artist: Thomas Brewster Kass
- Year: 1985
- Location: Salt Lake City, Utah, United States
- 40°44′49.4″N 111°55′16.3″W

Spirit Poles is a sculpture by Thomas Brewster Kass, installed in Salt Lake City's Jordan Park, in the U.S. state of Utah.

== Description and history ==
Dedicated on July 27, 1985, to represent Korea in the park's International Peace Gardens, the artwork includes two painted telephone poles, each of which measure approximately 12 ft. x 12 1/2 in. x 13 in. The poles have faces and Korean characters. Spirit Poles was surveyed by the Smithsonian Institution's "Save Outdoor Sculpture!" program in 1994.

== See also ==
- 1985 in art
