= Bust of Mahatma Gandhi (Salt Lake City) =

Sculpture in Salt Lake City, Utah, U.S.

- The sculpture in 2021
- Subject: Mahatma Gandhi
- Location: Salt Lake City, Utah, U.S.; 40°44′49.9″N 111°55′12.4″W

A bust of Mahatma Gandhi is installed in Salt Lake City, Utah, United States. Donated by the Government of India and the Consul General of India in 1997, the sculpture is displayed in India's section of Jordan Park's International Peace Gardens. The work was dedicated on May 10, 1997.
