= A Monument to Peace: Our Hope for the Children =

Monument in Salt Lake City, Utah, United States

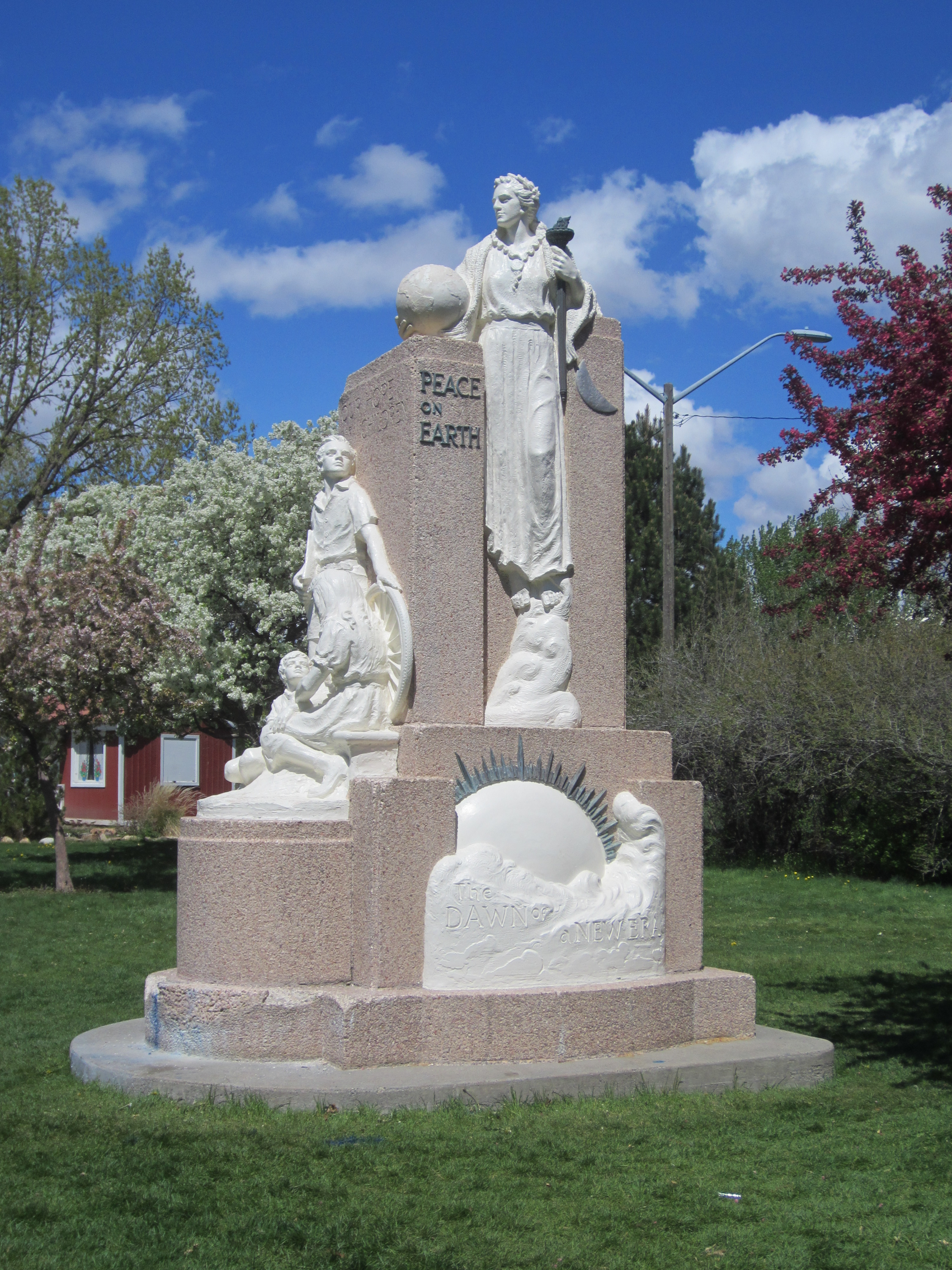
- Monument, May 2021
- Artist: Avard Fairbanks
- Location: Salt Lake City, Utah, United States
- 40°44′52.5″N 111°55′10.7″W

A Monument to Peace: Our Hope for the Children is a monument by Avard Fairbanks, installed in Salt Lake City's Jordan Park in the U.S. state of Utah. The work has several titles and is sometimes considered more than one sculpture. Other titles include:

- International Peace Garden Monument: Our Hope for the Children
- International Peace Garden Monument: Peace on Earth
- Our Hope for the Children
- Peace on Earth
- The Dawn of a New Era
- The Dawn of a New Era: Peace

== Description and history ==
The monument represents the United States in Jordan Park's International Peace Gardens. Inscriptions read "Our hope for the children", "Peace on Earth", and "The Dawn of a New Era". The artwork is administered by Salt Lake County's Parks and Recreation department. It was surveyed by the Smithsonian Institution's "Save Outdoor Sculpture" program in 1993–1994. The monument has been included in published walking tours of Salt Lake City.

== See also ==
- List of public art in Salt Lake City
