= Peace Cradle =

Sculpture by Dennis Smith

- The sculpture in Salt Lake City's Gallivan Center, 2021
- Artist: Dennis Smith
- Medium: Bronze sculpture
- Location: Salt Lake City, Utah, United States

Peace Cradle is a sculpture by Dennis Smith. Two copies are installed in Salt Lake City, Utah; one is installed in the Gallivan Center and another represents Russia in Jordan Park's International Peace Gardens.

== International Peace Gardens, Jordan Park ==
The bronze sculpture in Jordan Park's International Peace Gardens was dedicated in 1991. It measures approximately 36 x 31 x 17 inches and rests on a concrete base which measures approximately 38 x 39 x 26 inches. The artwork depicts two young girls playing cat's cradle. An inscription on the base reads: "PEACE CRADLE / by / Dennis Smith / In Memory of / LOWELL F. TURNER / 1916-1989". The artwork was surveyed by the Smithsonian Institution's "Save Outdoor Sculpture" program in 1993.

Sculpture in Jordan Park's International Peace Gardens
