= Gallivan Center =

Urban plaza in Salt Lake City, Utah, U.S.

John W. Gallivan Utah Center

- Location within Utah
- Former name: Block 57
- Namesake: John W. Gallivan
- Type: Town square
- Owner: Redevelopment Agency of Salt Lake City
- Maintained by: Salt Lake City Public Services
- Area: 3.65 acres (1.48 ha)
- Addresses: 239 South Main Street; Salt Lake City, Utah 84111
- Location: Downtown Salt Lake City
- Coordinates: 40°45′52″N 111°53′23″W

Construction
- Construction start: August 1992
- Completion: November 1998
- Inauguration: July 1993

Other
- Website: www.thegallivancenter.com

The John W. Gallivan Utah Center (commonly known as the Gallivan Center), is an urban plaza in the heart of Downtown Salt Lake City, Utah, United States.

== Description ==
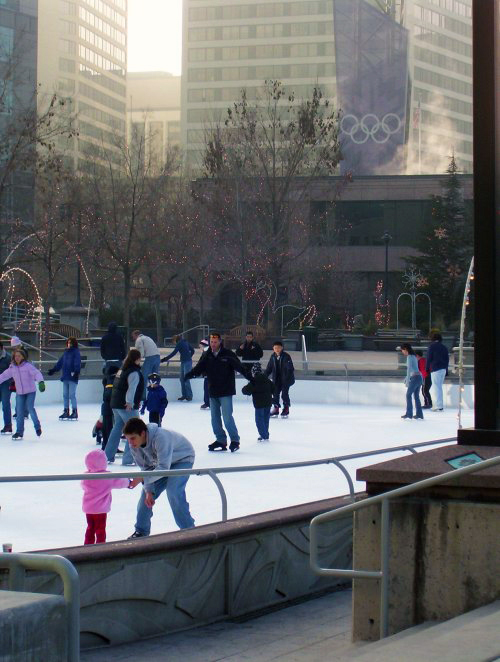
Ice Skating at the Gallivan Center

The plaza, which has been described as "Salt Lake City's outdoor living room", was named in honor of John W. Gallivan, the former, long-time publisher of The Salt Lake Tribune. The plaza is situated between East 200 South on the north, the Salt Lake City Marriott Hotel City Center on the east, East Gallivan Avenue on the south, the Wells Fargo Center on the southwest, and the One Utah Center on the northeast. An adjacent TRAX station (Gallivan Plaza) takes its name from the plaza. (The light rail station is served by the Blue and Green lines).

The plaza was a popular gathering place during the 2002 Olympic Winter Games. Kazuo Matsubayashi's Asteroid Landed Softly sundial is one of the prominent features of the plaza, in addition to several other works of public art. The plaza also includes a seasonal ice skating rink that serves as a racquetball and basketball court during warmer months. The plaza is also the center of Salt Lake City's First Night celebrations. The Gallivan Center also regularly hosts gatherings organized by the Food Truck League, a Utah-based food-truck organization.

The Gallivan Center is owned by the Community Reinvestment Agency (formerly known as the Redevelopment Agency or "RDA") of Salt Lake City. Salt Lake City Public Services has partnered with CRA to provide the management, programming and maintenance.

== History ==
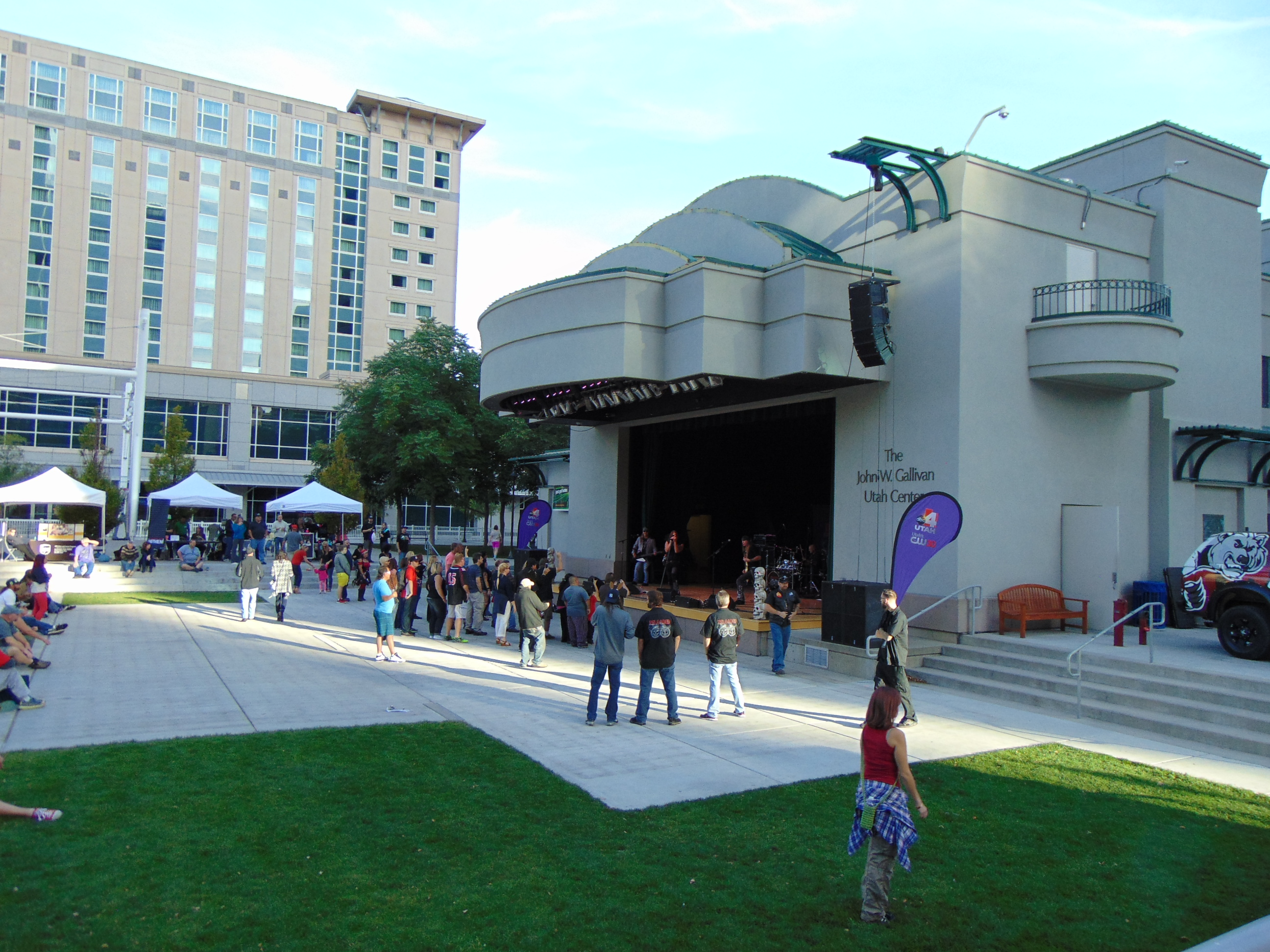
Stage at the Gallivan Center, 2016

The site of the Gallivan Center was formerly identified as "Block 57" and consisted of rundown buildings and parking lots. The CRA began construction on the project in August 1992, but work continued past the opening date (July 1993) until the project was completed in November 1998. In 2012 the original ice rink was replaced by a LEED Gold certified facility.

== See also ==
- Peace Cradle
