= International Peace Gardens =

Garden in Salt Lake City, Utah, U.S.

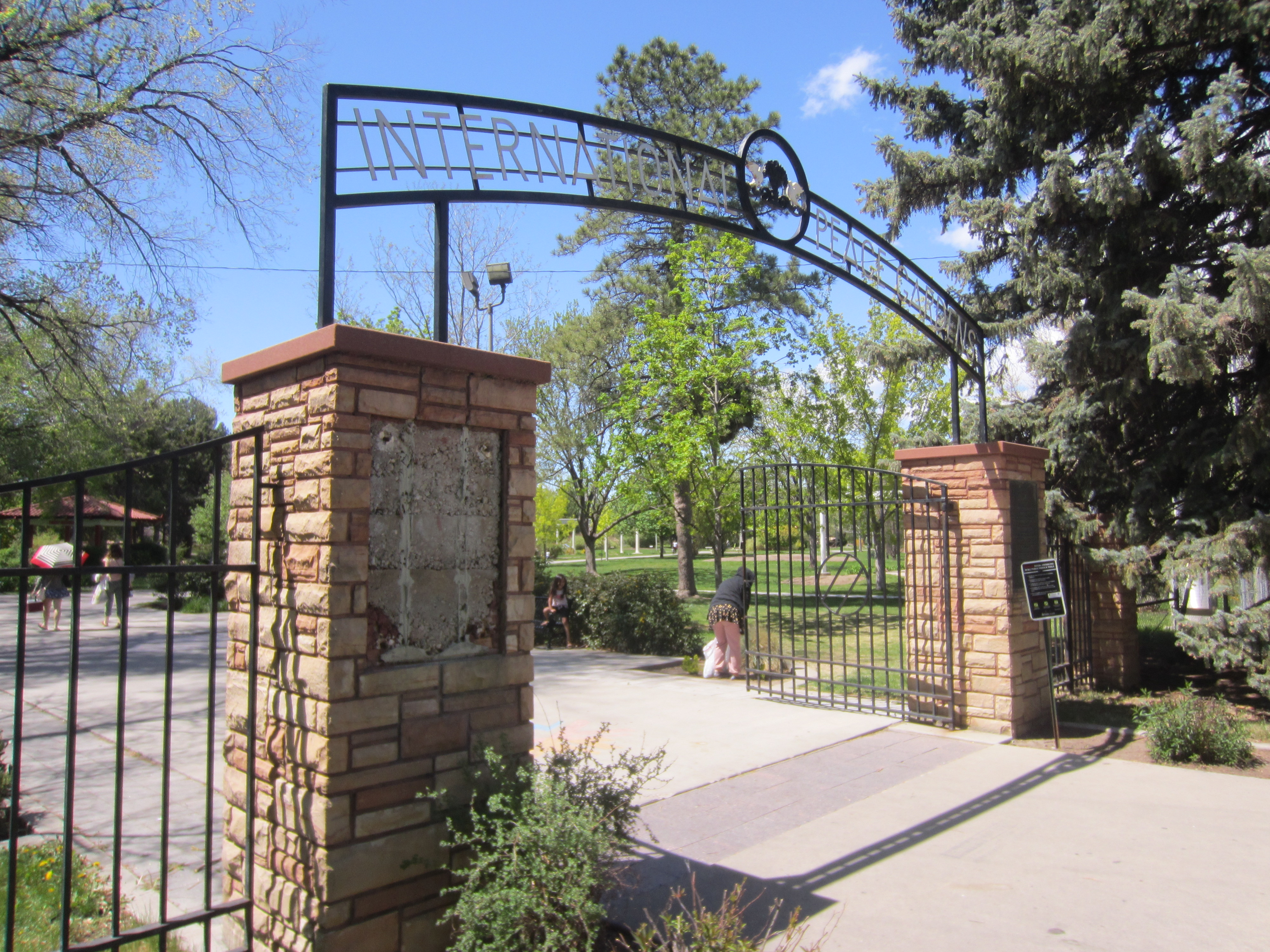
- Entrance to the park
- Interactive map of International Peace Gardens
- Type: Botanical garden
- Location: Jordan Park, Salt Lake City, Utah, United States
- Area: 11 acres (4.5 ha)
- Website: Official website

The International Peace Gardens is a botanical garden located in Jordan Park in Salt Lake City, Utah.

The garden was conceived in 1939 and dedicated in 1952. The International Peace Gardens has welcomed tens of thousands of travelers from a number of countries, including exchange partners from Salt Lake's several sister cities. The garden is under the direction of the Salt Lake Council of Women Past Presidents Council. Each participating Utah-based nation group is allotted a plot in which to create a garden with native plantings, garden architecture, and statues of world peace leaders typical of its homeland and culture. The Peace Gardens currently represents the cultural diversity of 28 nations.

== Description and history ==
The gardens comprise 11 acres (4.5 ha) and are located in Jordan Park along the banks of the Jordan River in Salt Lake City, Utah. They are intended to symbolize democracy and world peace, brotherly love, history, literature, and cultural heritage.

The project was initiated in 1939 by Ruey Otto Wiesley, Citizenship Chair, for good citizenship and to give foreign origin groups a specific part in the beautification of the city for the coming Centennial Celebration of 1947. The idea was presented to the City Commission and the Parks department and was given their approval and support. The garden project was halted prior to planting due to the onset of World War II, but was resumed in 1947.

Each of the foreign origin groups is allotted a garden section which they design, create and plant at their own expense. Plans are approved by the City Parks Director before they are implemented. Upon the completion of each garden, it is dedicated and presented to the city, who then assumes the permanent maintenance of the garden.

The United States became the first country represented in the gardens, and has the largest section of the gardens. The second section to be organized, planted, and dedicated was the Japanese garden. Others followed suit every year until a total of 28 countries were represented within the garden.

Sculptures include: A Monument to Peace: Our Hope for the Children, Bauta Stone, the bust of Mahatma Gandhi, The Little Mermaid, Irish Cross, Olmec Head Replica, Peace Cradle, Preaching Buddha, and Spirit Poles.

== Gallery ==
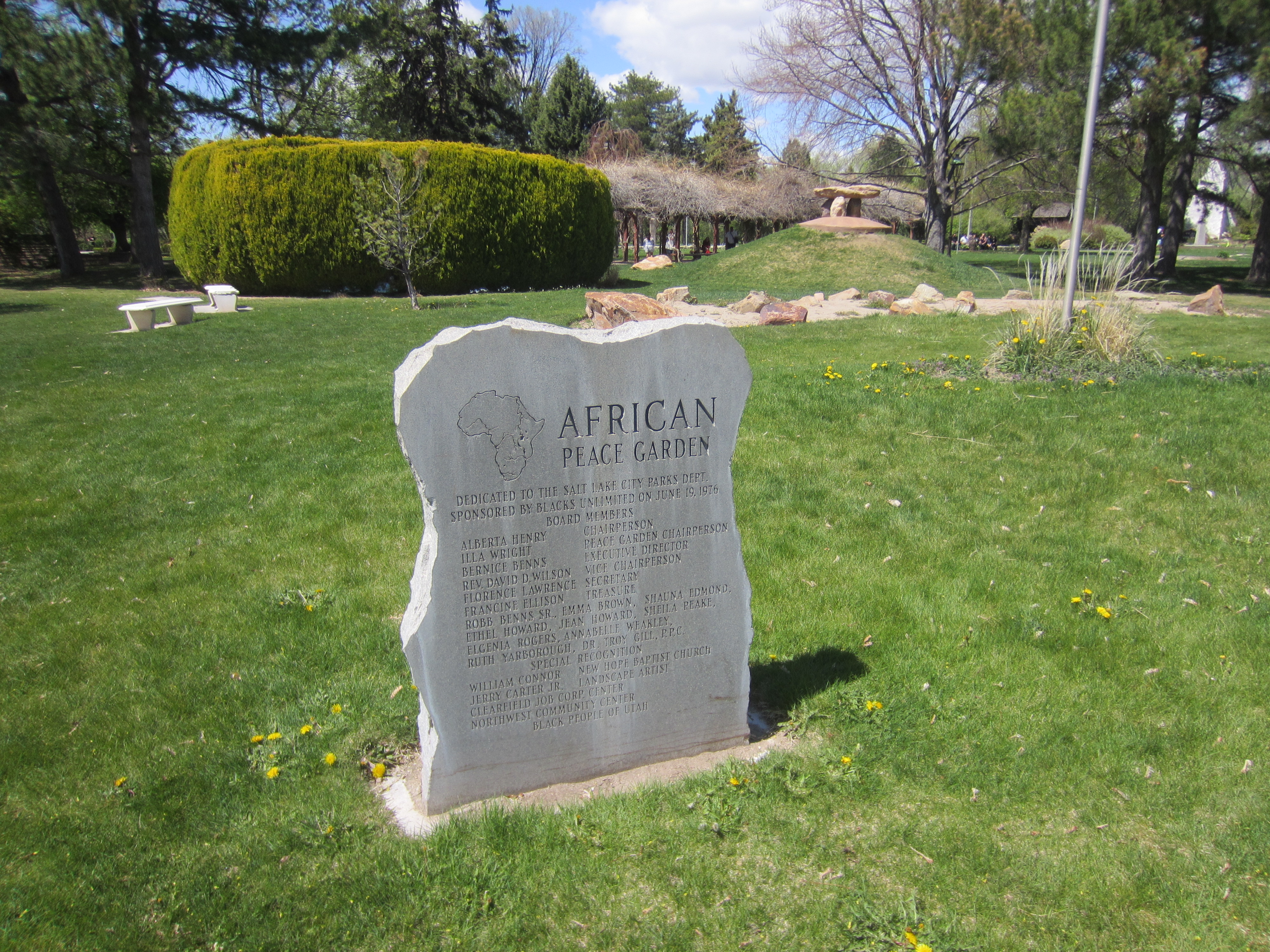
African Peace Garden

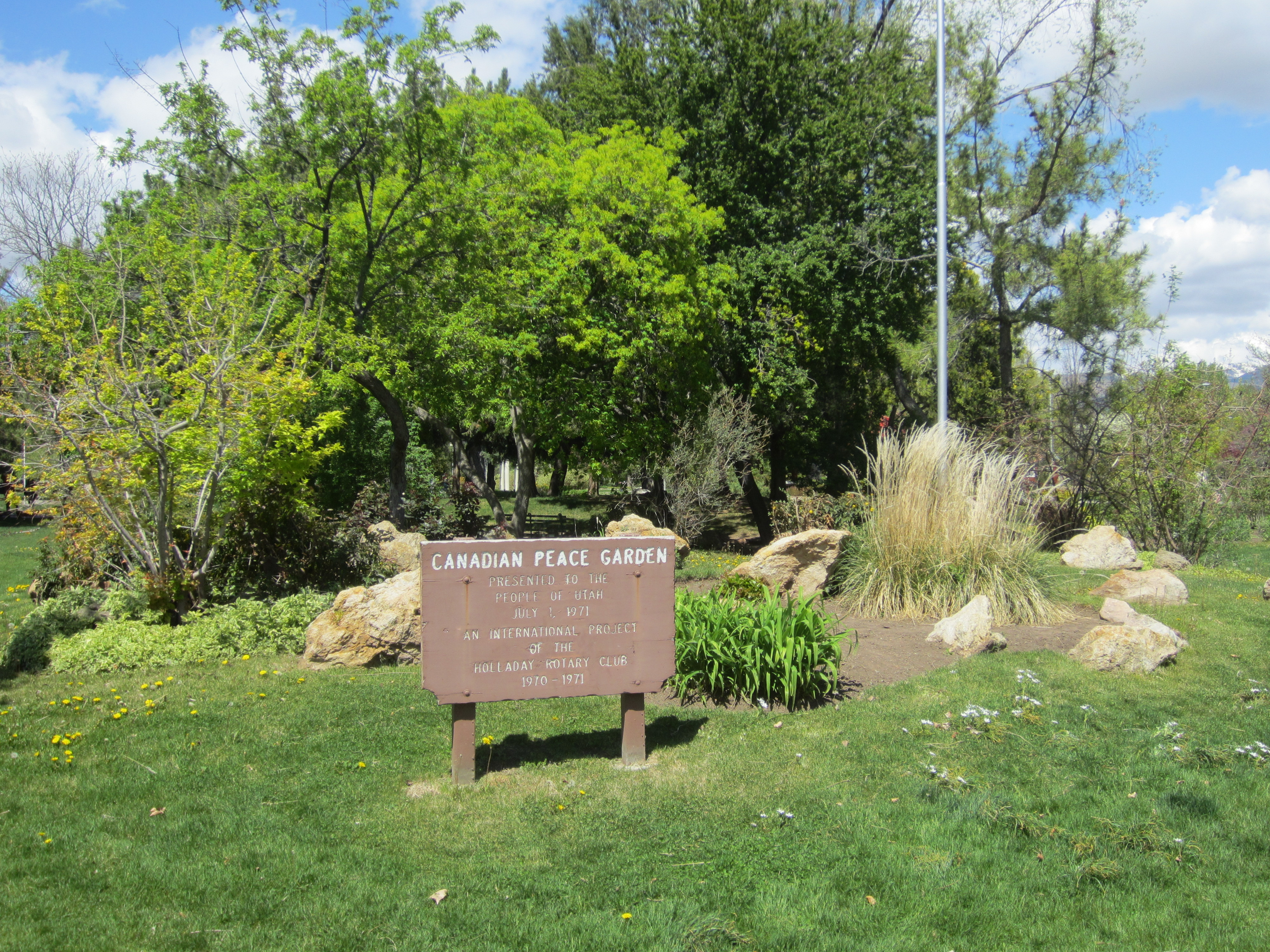
Canadian Peace Garden

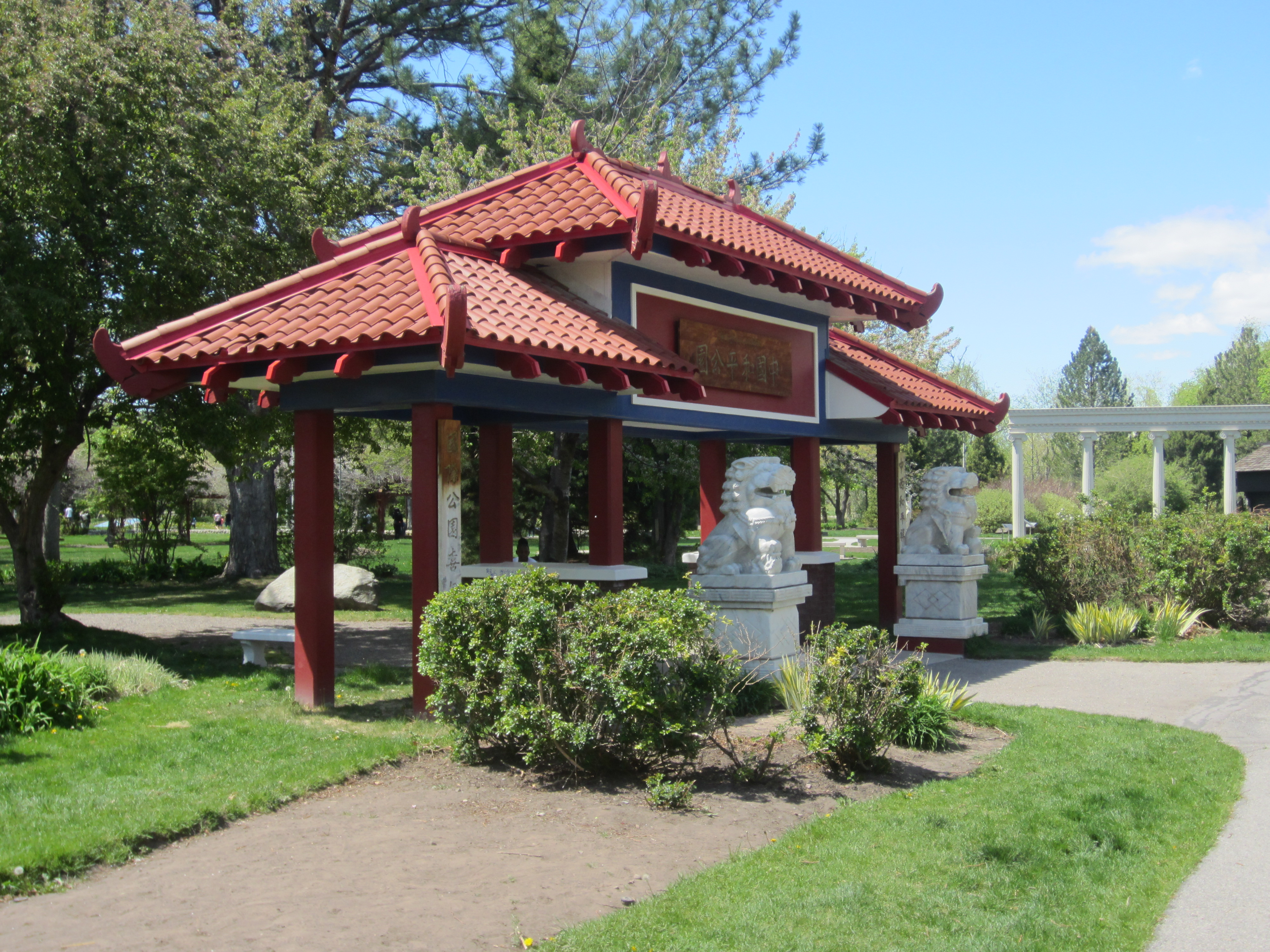
Chinese Peace Garden

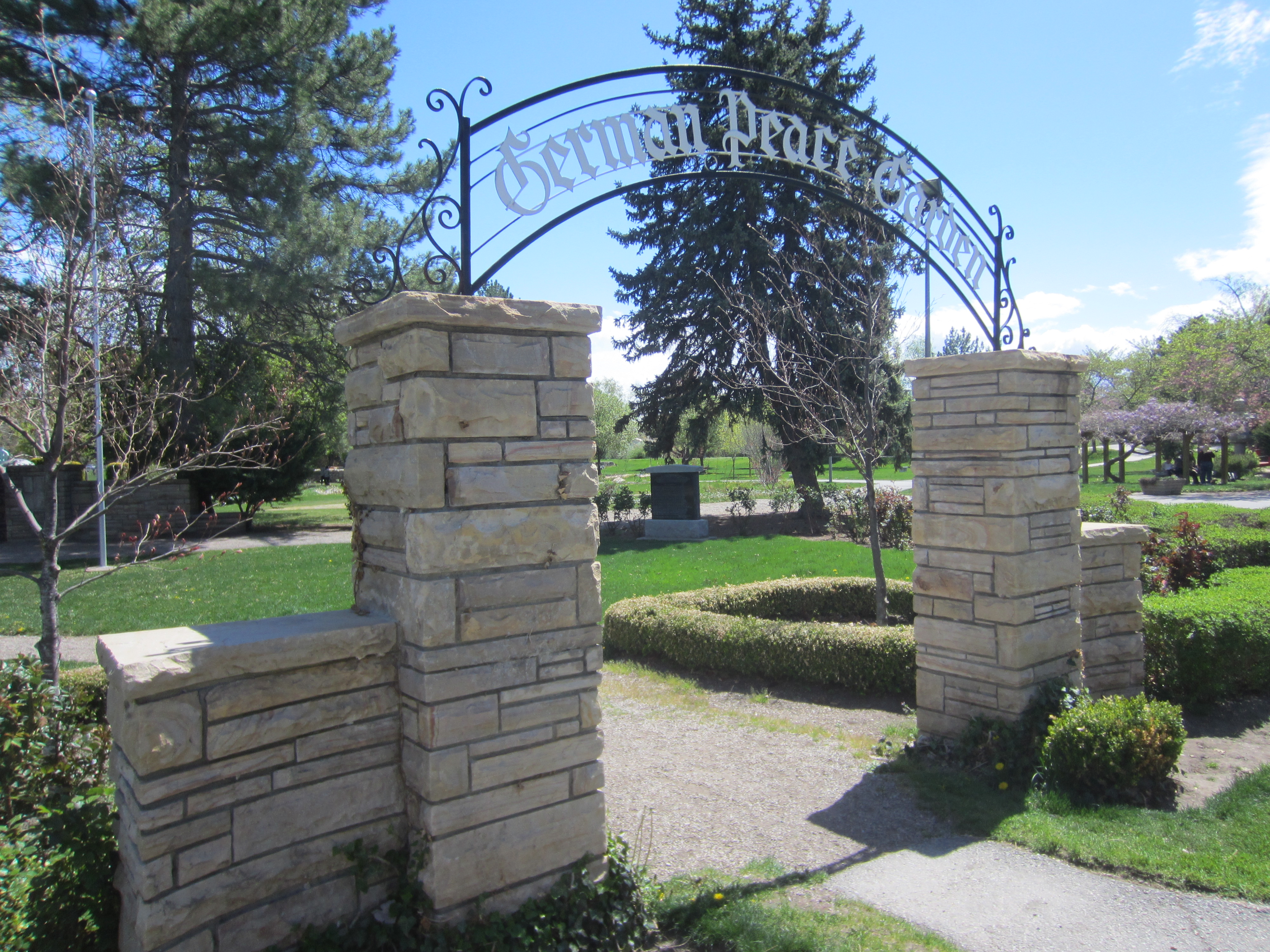
German Peace Garden

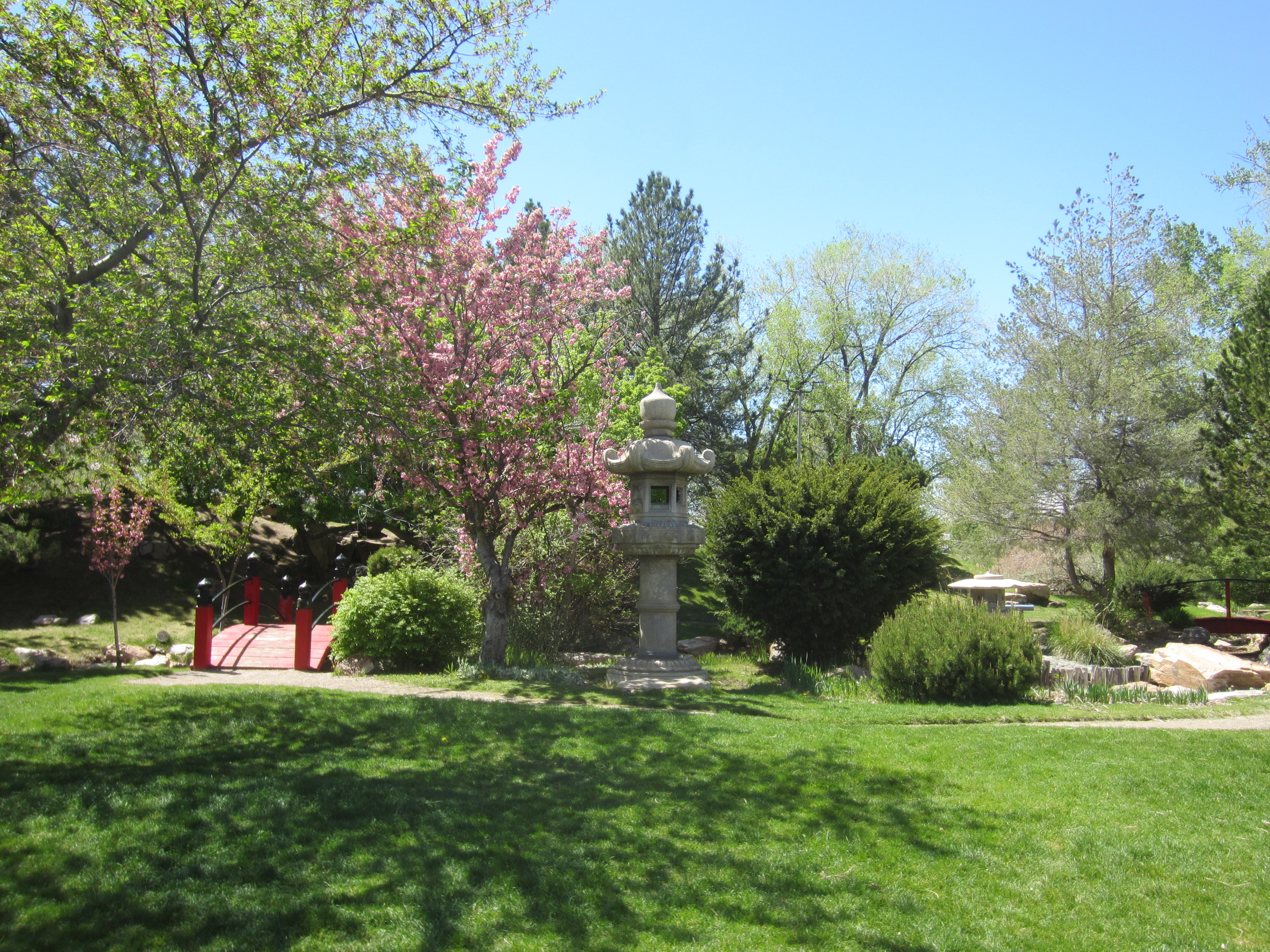
Japanese Peace Garden

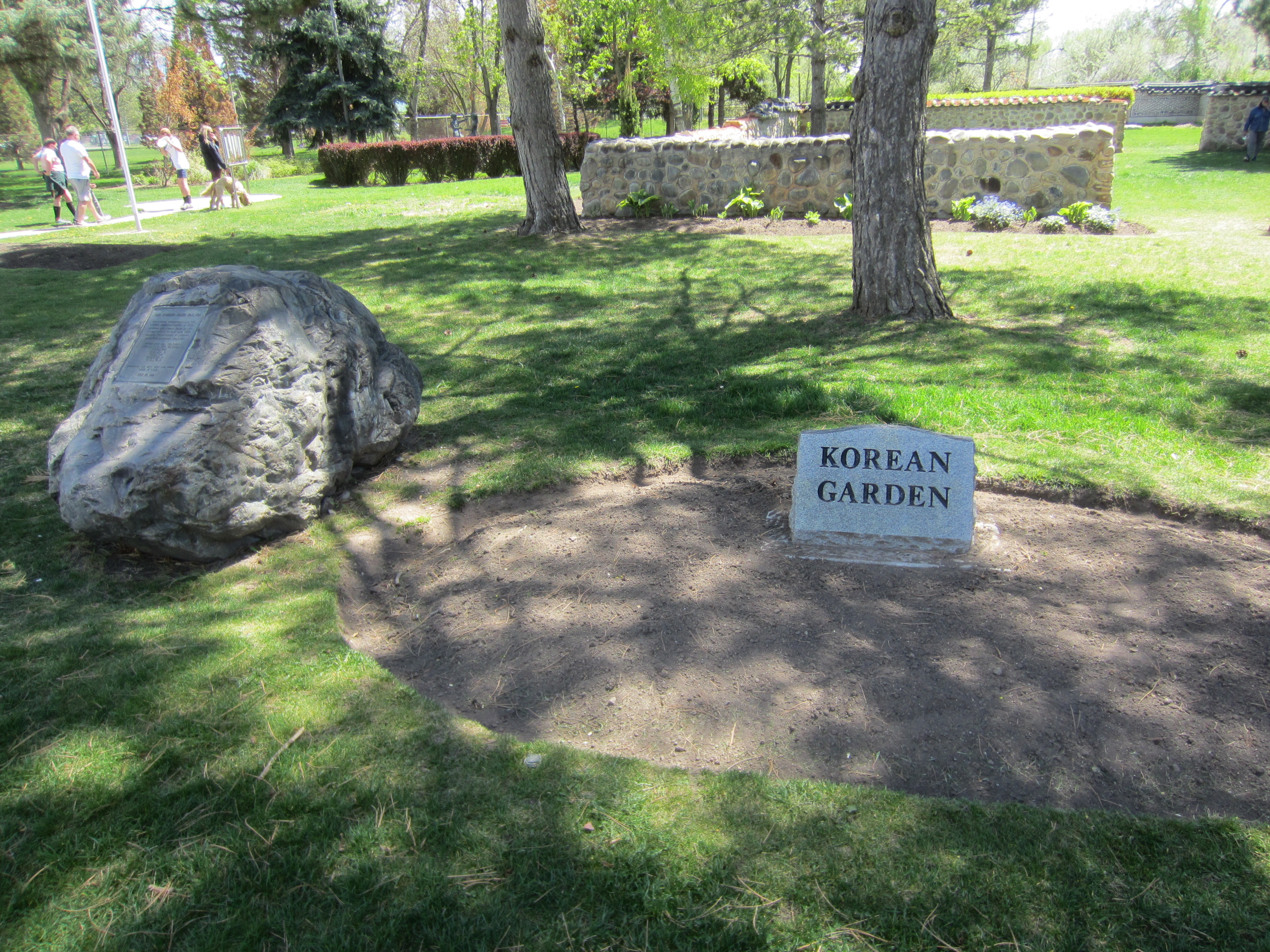
Korean Peace Garden

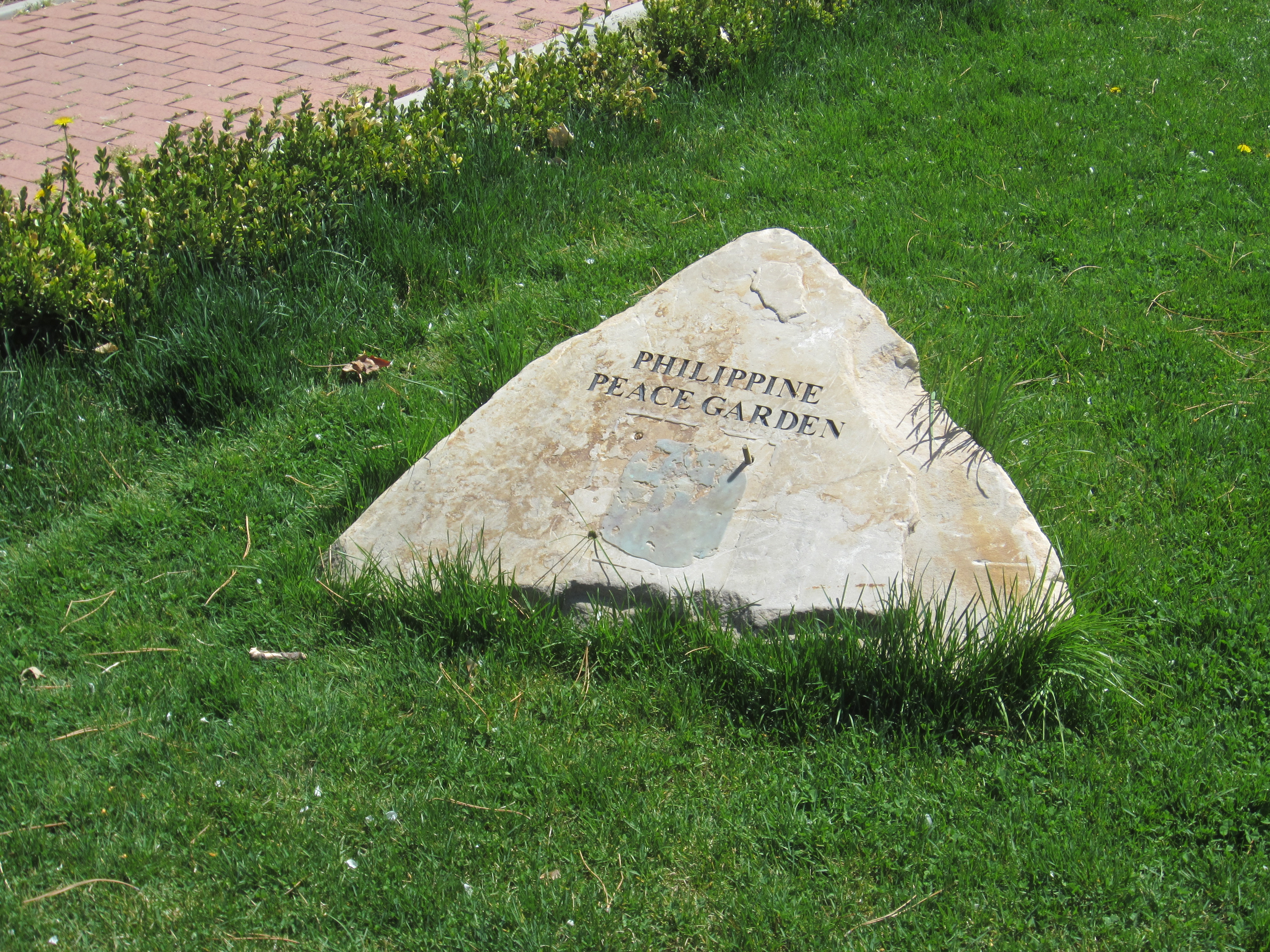
Philippine Peace Garden

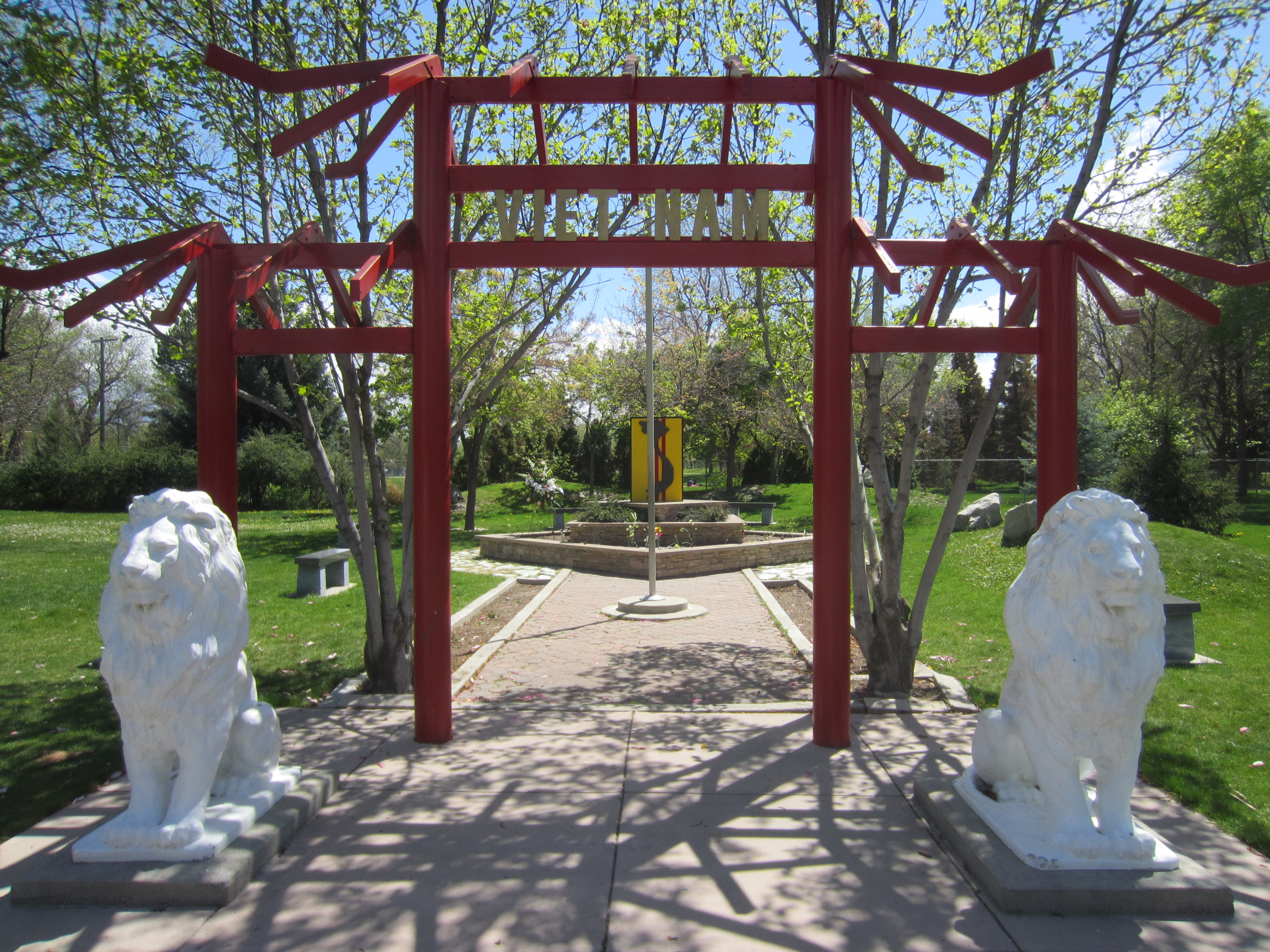
Vietnam Peace Garden

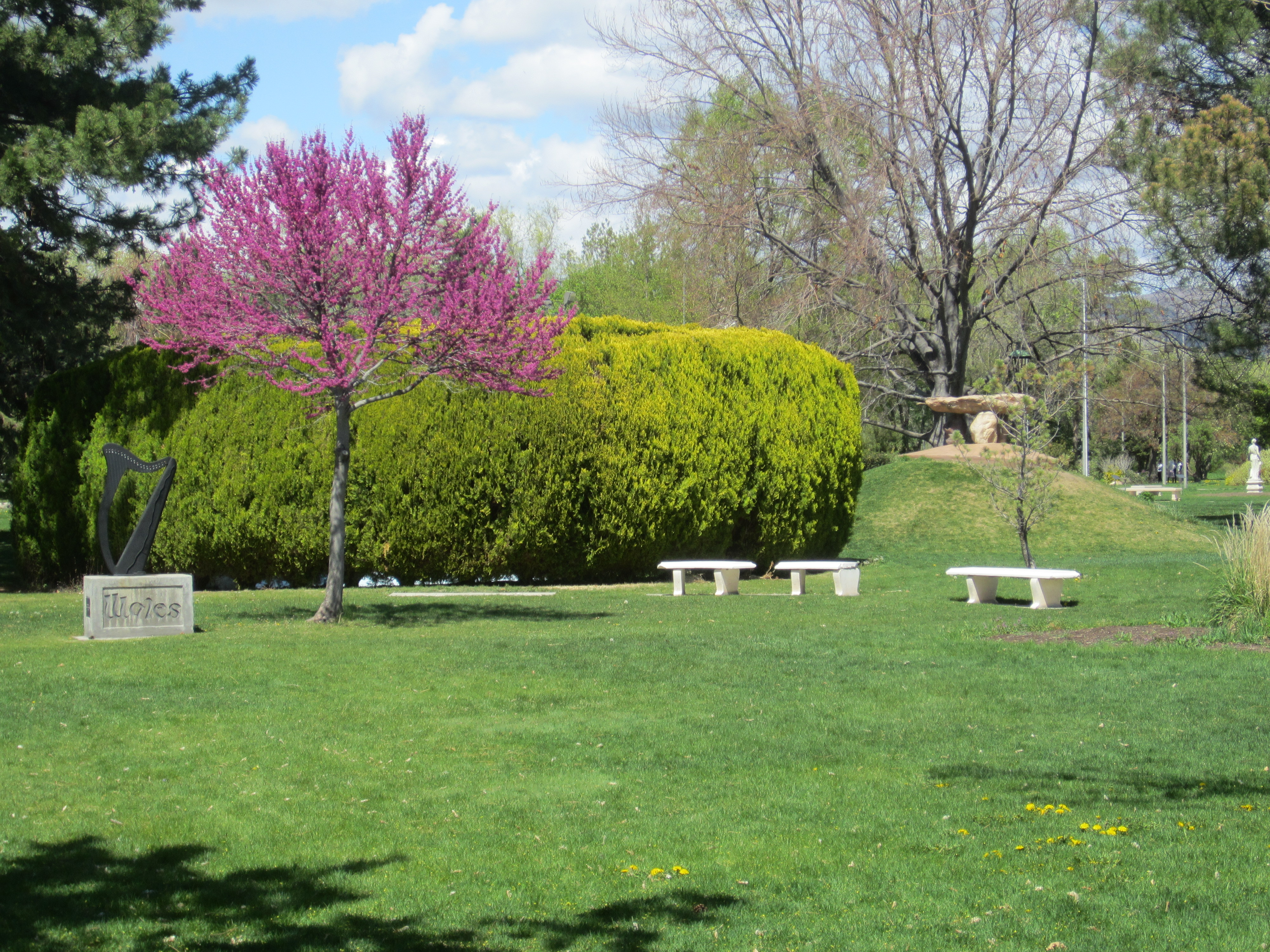
Wales Peace Garden

== See also ==
- List of botanical gardens in the United States
