= Food Truck League =

Food-truck organization based in Utah

The Food Truck League
- Abbreviation: FTL
- Formation: 2015
- Founder: Taylor Harris
- Type: Organization
- Headquarters: Salt Lake City, Utah, U.S.
- Website: foodtruckleague.com

The Food Truck League (FTL) is an organization based in Salt Lake City, Utah. It coordinates food truck gatherings, and also manages catering requests for private events and workplace lunches.

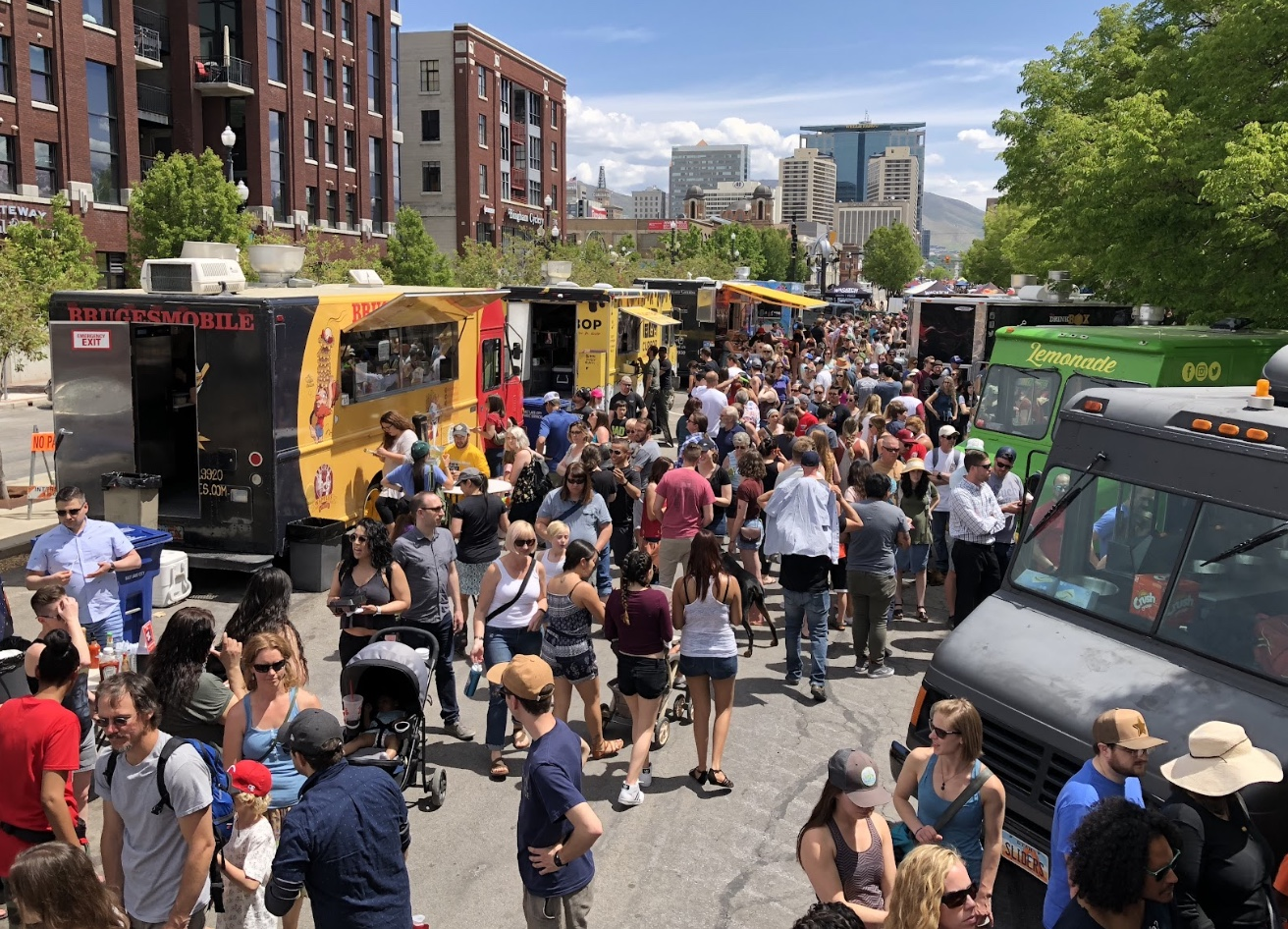
A Food Truck League event in Salt Lake City, Utah (2024).

== History ==
The league was founded in 2015 by Taylor Harris, who later left a career as an investment research analyst to focus on the organization full-time. While it began in Utah, coverage has also placed the league’s operations in Dallas, Texas, and in Arizona.

FTL works with municipalities to coordinate food-truck participation in public events. The organization also manages catering requests for private gatherings and workplace lunches. The Food Truck League organizes recurring food-truck gatherings at venues along the Wasatch Front, including Salt Lake City’s Gallivan Center. Local media have also covered its regular "League Night" events.

Charitable efforts have included food-truck fundraisers and coordinated delivery of meals to health-care workers at hospitals across Utah during the COVID-19 pandemic.

== League Nights ==
League Nights are recurring community food truck gatherings coordinated by the Food Truck League in partnership with Utah municipalities. The events bring rotating groups of trucks to outdoor public spaces on a weekly schedule, typically from spring through early autumn.

Regular League Night venues include Murray Park in Murray, Legacy Park in North Salt Lake, and locations within Daybreak such as Highland Park and North Shore. Downtown Salt Lake City hosts weekday lunch round-ups at the Gallivan Center, continuing throughout the year.

Coverage in local outlets describes the gatherings as part of Utah’s wider food-truck culture and credits the League with helping expand small-business opportunities across the Wasatch Front. According to city announcements, attendance often reaches several hundred visitors per evening, with participating vendors rotating through an online schedule managed by the League.

The format has since been adopted in multiple cities as a civic partnership model combining food vendors with live music, family activities, or charity elements.
