= Olmec Head, Number 8 =

Outdoor sculpture in Chicago, Illinois, U.S.

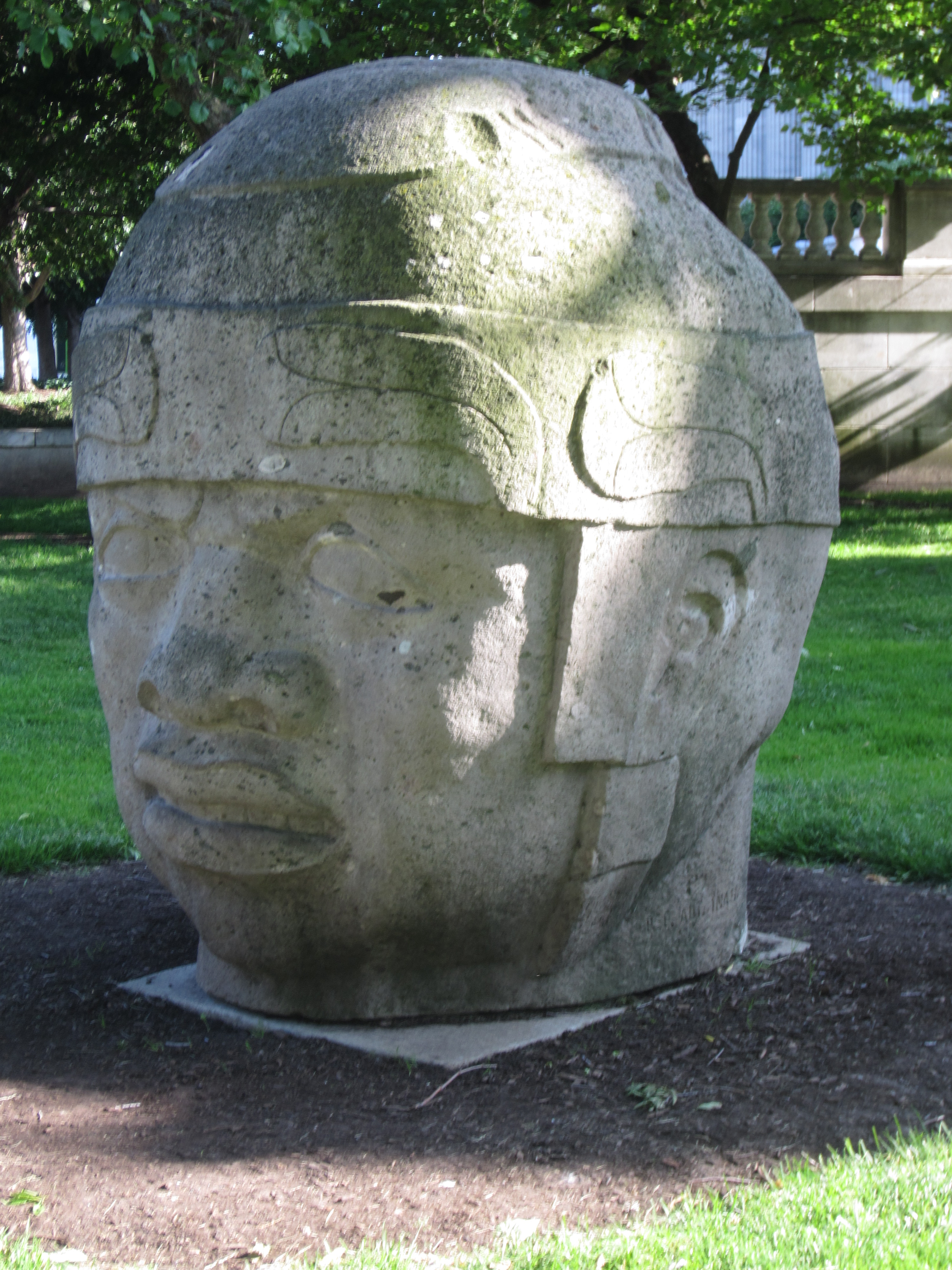
- The sculpture in Chicago in 2015
- Year: 2000
- Medium: Carved stone
- Dimensions: 2.1 m (7 ft)
- Location: Field Museum of Natural History, Chicago, Illinois, U.S.; 41.86698646781367°N 87.61553541422988°W

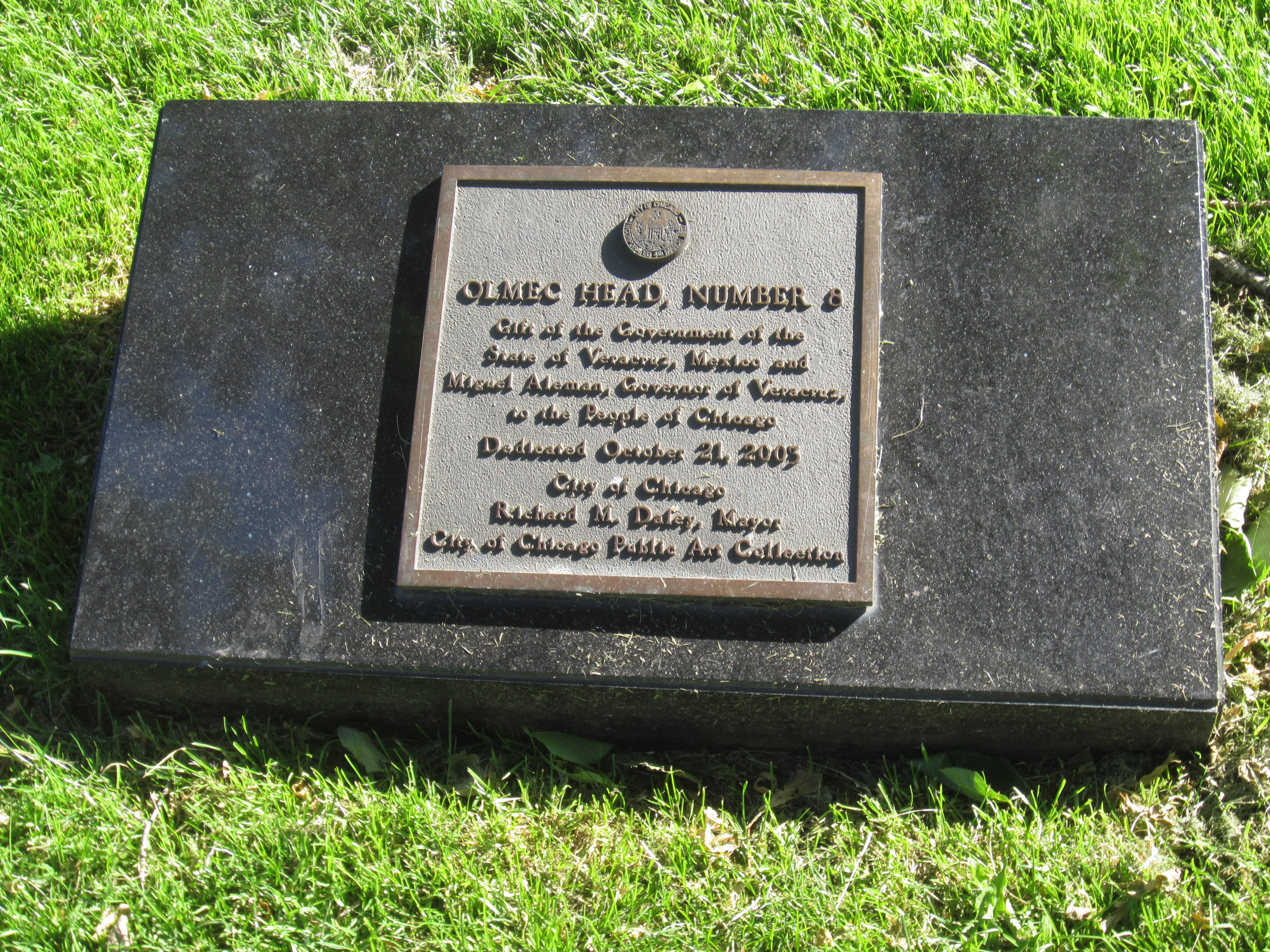
Plaque for the sculpture

Olmec Head, Number 8 is a 7-foot (2.1-meter) tall outdoor colossal head sculpture on the east side of the north entrance to the Field Museum of Natural History in Chicago, Illinois, created by Mexican sculptor Ignacio Pérez Solano (1931–2021). A plaque on the site of the statue says it was a gift of the government of the State of Verazcruz, Mexico, to the people of Chicago, on October 21, 2003.

It is one of several reproductions of San Lorenzo Colossol Head 8, which is now in the Xalapa Museum of Anthropology in Xalapa, Veracruz, Mexico.

== See also ==
- List of public art in Chicago
- Olmec colossal heads
- Olmec Head Replica, Salt Lake City
