= Bauta Stone =

1972 sculpture by Randi A. Bjorge in Salt Lake City, Utah, U.S.

- The sculpture in 2021
- Artist: Randi A. Bjorge
- Year: 1972
- Medium: Concrete sculpture
- Location: Salt Lake City, Utah, U.S.
- 40°44′53.7″N 111°55′13.6″W

Bauta Stone is a 1972 concrete sculpture by Randi A. Bjorge, installed in Salt Lake City's Jordan Park, in the U.S. state of Utah. The stele measures approximately 20 ft. x 35 in. x 16 in. and displays Norwegian symbols.

The monument includes images of the midnight sun, a snowflake, a reminder of the mountain, fishing, shipping and farming. The designs are bordered by rosemaling.
