= Preaching Buddha (Salt Lake City) =

Sculpture in Salt Lake City, Utah, U.S.

- The sculpture in 2021
- Subject: Buddha
- Location: Salt Lake City, Utah, United States
- 40°44′49.9″N 111°55′12.1″W

Preaching Buddha is a bronze bas-relief sculpture located in the International Peace Gardens at 9th West and 10th South, Salt Lake City, Utah. Dedicated in 1965, the artwork, which measures approximately 35 x 18 x 7 inches (89 x 46 x 18 cm), depicts Buddha seated on a lotus blossom. It was presented by India's Ministry of Education to the International Peace Gardens. The sculpture is part of the Indian Garden section, promoting cultural understanding and world peace. It is set on a concrete base with a plaque detailing its dedication.

== Description and history ==
The bronze bas-relief, which depicts Buddha on a lotus blossom, is set within a concrete base. Dedicated in 1965, the artwork measures approximately 35 x 18 x 7 in. A nearby plaque reads:

PREACHING BUDDHA / PRESENTED BY / GOVERNMENT OF INDIA / MINISTRY OF EDUCATION / TO / INTERNATIONAL PEACE GARDENS / BY / CONSUL GENERAL, P. N. MENON / DEDICATED APRIL 22, 1965

The sculpture's dedication was to coincide with Utah's Pioneer Centennial in 1947. However, World War II interrupted progress.

The artwork was surveyed by the Smithsonian Institution's "Save Outdoor Sculpture!" program in 1993.
