= Asteroid Landed Softly =

Sculpture in Salt Lake City, Utah, U.S.

- The sculpture in 2021
- Artist: Kazuo Matsubiyashi
- Dimensions: 9.1 m × 1.2 m × 0.61 m (30 ft × 4 ft × 2 ft)
- Location: Salt Lake City, Utah, United States
- 40°45′52.3″N 111°53′23.4″W

Asteroid Landed Softly is a metal and stone sculpture by Kazuo Matsubiyashi, installed in Salt Lake City, Utah, United States. The artwork measures approximately 30 x 4 x 2 feet. It features a boulder on top of a column which splits into two legs, and functions as a sundial. The artwork was surveyed by the Smithsonian Institution's "Save Outdoor Sculpture!" program in 1993.
