= Jordan Park (Salt Lake City) =

Public park in Salt Lake City, Utah, United States

- An arch in Jordan Park

- Location within Utah Location within the United States
- Location: 900 West & 1000 South, Salt Lake City, Utah; United States
- Coordinates: 40°44′49″N 111°55′05″W
- Area: 33.5 acres (13.6 ha)
- Elevation: 4,226 feet (1,288 m)
- Created: 1918
- Etymology: Jordan River
- Owner: Salt Lake City
- Operator: Salt Lake City Public Lands Department
- Public transit: Utah Transit Authority local bus
- Facilities: Public restrooms & parking lots
- Website: www.slc.gov/parks/parks-division/jordan-park/

Jordan Park is a public park along the Jordan River in Salt Lake City, Utah, United States.

== Description ==
The park is located at 900 West & 1000 South. It was first created in 1918 and now covers 33.5 acres (13.6 ha). The International Peace Gardens are located within the park.
