= Sanborn (surname) =

Sanborn is a surname of Old English origin. Notable people with the surname include:

- Alan Sanborn (born 1957), politician from the U.S. state of Michigan
- Alden Sprague Sanborn (1820–1885), 7th mayor of Madison, Wisconsin, legislator, judge
- Alvan F. Sanborn (1866–1966), American journalist and author
- Arthur Loomis Sanborn (1850–1920), United States federal judge
- Aroline Sanborn (1825–1900), American diarist
- Ashton Sanborn (1882–1970), American archaeologist.
- Chase Sanborn (born 1956), Canadian trumpet player
- Colin Campbell Sanborn (1897–1962), American biologist
- Daniel Alfred Sanborn, surveyor
- David Sanborn (1945–2024), American alto saxophonist
- David C. Sanborn (1827–1883)
- Donald Sanborn, American traditional Catholic bishop
- Edwin David Sanborn, New Hampshire educator
- Ethel Ida Sanborn (1883–1952), American paleobotanist and professor of botany
- Francis Gregory Sanborn (1838–1884), American entomologist
- Franklin Benjamin Sanborn (1831–1917), Massachusetts journalist, author, and reformer, supporter of John Brown
- Gail Sanborn, American politician
- Garrison Sanborn (born 1985), American football player
- Heather Sanborn, American attorney, businesswoman, Maine Public Advocate, member of the Maine Senate, Maine State Representative
- Helen P. Sanborn (1858–1922), American educator and civic worker
- Henry B. Sanborn (1845–1912), American rancher known as the "Father of Amarillo, Texas."
- Herbert Charles Sanborn (1873–1967), American philosopher, political candidate
- Jack Sanborn (born 2000), American football player
- Jim Sanborn, American sculptor
- John B. Sanborn, American lawyer, politician, and soldier
- John B. Sanborn Jr., lawyer, politician, and United States federal judge
- John C. Sanborn, United States Representative
- John Sewell Sanborn, Canadian educator, lawyer, judge and political figure
- Kate Sanborn, American author, teacher and lecturer
- Kenneth Sanborn, American politician and judge
- Kerri Sanborn, American bridge player
- Pitts Sanborn, American music critic
- Ryne Sanborn, American actor
- Walter Sanborn, United States judge
- Winfred J. Sanborn (1869–1947), American politician
