= Sanborn =

Sanborn may refer to:

== Places in the United States ==
- Sanborn, Iowa
- Sanborn, Minnesota
- Sanborn, Nebraska
- Sanborn, New York
- Sanborn, North Dakota
- Sanborn, Ashland County, Wisconsin, a town
- Sanborn (community), Wisconsin, an unincorporated community
- Sanborn County, South Dakota
- Sanborn Township, Michigan
- Lake Sanborn, a lake in Minnesota

== Other uses ==
- Sanborn (surname)
- Sanborn maps, maps of U.S. cities and towns in the 19th and 20th centuries, published by The Sanborn Map Company
  - Daniel Alfred Sanborn, surveyor and founder of The Sanborn Map Company
- Grupo Sanborns, a large restaurant chain in Mexico, owned by business magnate Carlos Slim Helú
