= Union Square (Salt Lake City) =

Historic block in Salt Lake City, Utah, U.S.

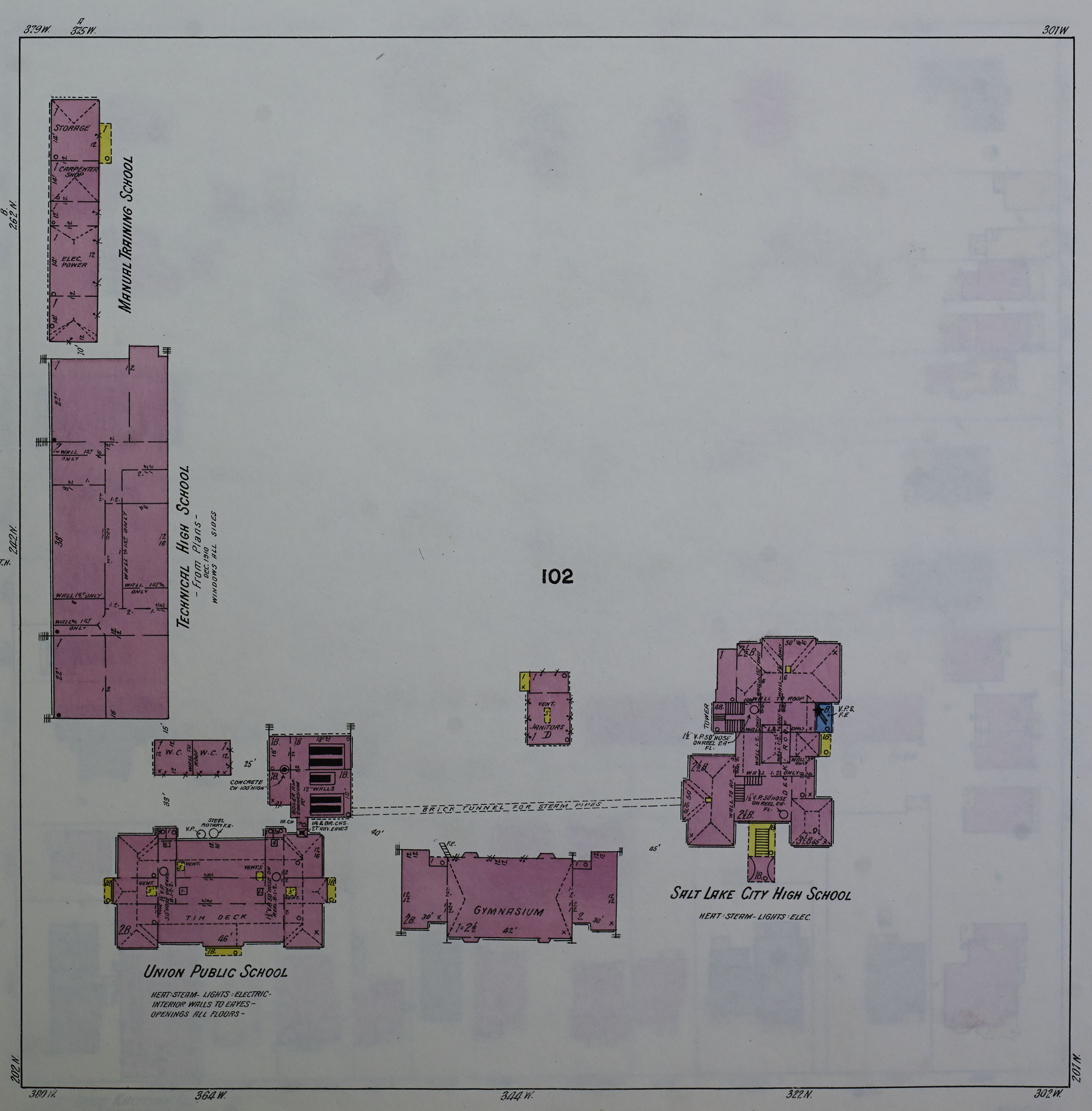
- Union Square, from a 1911 Sanborn Map
- Interactive map of Union Square
- Type: City block
- Location: Salt Lake City, Utah, United States
- Coordinates: 40°46′29.56″N 111°54′3.97″W
- Area: 10 acres (4.0 ha)
- Founded: 1847

Union Square, also previously known as Public Square or University Square, is a historic block in Salt Lake City, Utah. Originally designated a public square during the initial 1847 survey of Salt Lake City, it was commonly used in the 1850s as a camping spot for recently arrived Mormon pioneers. As the city developed, the square became home to several educational institutions, including the University of Utah and has been home to West High School since 1901.

== Description ==
Union Square includes the entire 10-acre (4.0 ha) city block that is bounded on the north by 300 North, on the west by 400 West and on the east by 300 West. Formerly, 200 North marked the southern boundary before this section of street was closed and incorporated into the high school campus in 1961.

== History ==
On August 2, 1847, just days after the first Mormon settlers arrived in the Salt Lake Valley, Henry Sherwood and Orson Pratt began to survey and layout Salt Lake City, beginning at the newly established Salt Lake meridian. In the early surveys, four blocks were designated public squares, including Union Square. The other public squares became Pioneer Park, Washington Square, and Tenth Ward Square (currently the site of Trolley Square).

Upon the dissolution of the provisional government of Deseret in March 1851, due to the creation of the Utah Territory, Union Square was selected as the site for the territory's government buildings. Although no action was ever taken to construct buildings, and soon after, Fillmore, Utah was designated as capital city. For nearly a decade, in the 1850s, camps of newly arrived Mormon pioneers made use of Union Square, including during the handcart period. Later arriving emigrants would camp at Washington Square in another part of the city. In 1880, Salt Lake City gave the square to the University of Deseret (since renamed to University of Utah), beginning the square's long history with education in the area.

=== List of current institutions on the square ===
Name	Image	First opened	Notes
Salt Lake High School / West High School		1901	Salt Lake High School was established in 1890, and moved around to several different locations in the city until September 1901, when it moved into the recently vacated main building of the University of Utah on Union Square (along with the nearby former Church University building). In 1922, a three-story high school building opened, replacing the old University of Utah building. In March 2026, a groundbreaking for a new school building was held. Once completed, the school will move to this new structure, which is located across the street, on a different city block.

=== List of former institutions on the square ===
Name	Image	First opened	Notes
University of Deseret / University of Utah		1884	Union Square was given by Salt Lake City to the University of Deseret in 1880; prior to this, the university had been housed in a number of temporary locations. Construction on the university's building, designed by Obed Taylor, was started in 1881. Funding challenges stretched out its construction, but the building was completed enough to be occupied by the university beginning with the August 1884 term. In 1892, the school's name was changed to University of Utah and it moved to its present campus on the bench east of downtown, in 1900. Salt Lake High School moved into the old university building in September 1901. The structure was demolished in 1921, in conjunction with the construction of a new high school building.
Deaf Mute Institute / Union School		1890	In 1884, a deaf school was opened as a department of the University of Deseret. To house the school, the Deaf Mute Institute building was opened on Union Square in December 1890. In 1896, the school was moved to Ogden, Utah, eventually evolving into the Utah Schools for the Deaf and the Blind. After the deaf school vacated the building, the University of Utah remodeled it to house its normal/training school (for the training of teachers). In 1900, the University of Utah, including its training school, moved to a new campus and in September 1900, the Salt Lake Board of Education opened a primary school in the building called "University School"; it was shortly thereafter renamed "Union School." The Salt Lake High School was moved to Union Square in 1901 and over time, the high school began to use rooms in the Union School. By 1910, the school district was reporting that nearly all rooms were being occupied by the high school and that the Union School elementary students would be transferred to new schools the following year, allowing the high school to take complete control of the structure. After the building was incorporated into the high school, it became known as the "Union building." The structure was demolished during summer 1971.
Technical High School		1912	Housing vocational and practical training, construction of the Technical High School was started in 1910. The building was partially opened in September 1911, and work was finished in early 1912. Once the best example of a Prairie Style building in Utah, it was listed on the National Register of Historic Places in 1980, but was removed after the structure was torn down. It was known for its sculptures by Mahonri Young.
