= Church University (Salt Lake City) =

Former university in Salt Lake City, Utah, US

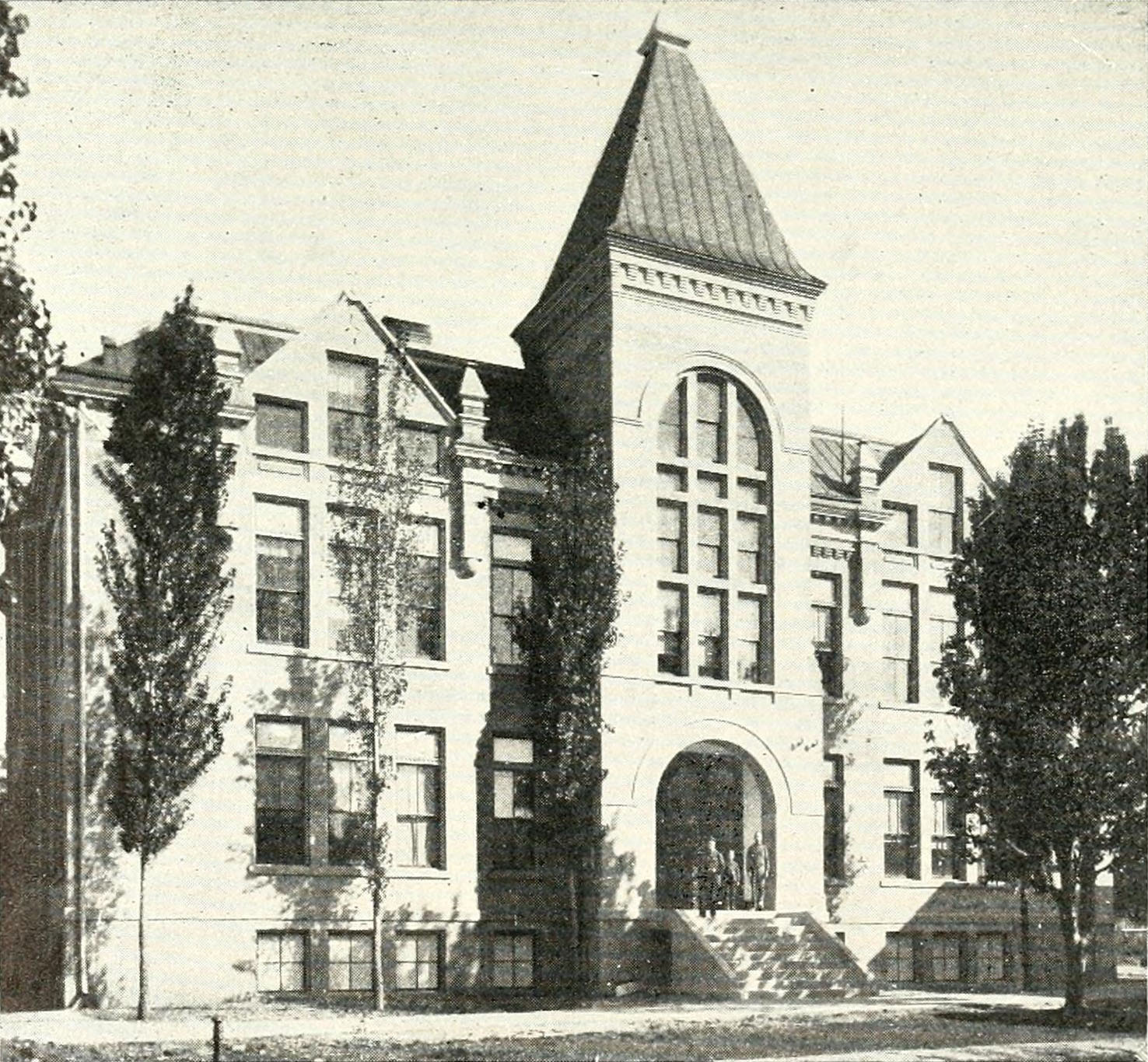
- Church University building in downtown Salt Lake City
- Other names: Brigham Young Academy of Salt Lake; University of the Church of Jesus Christ of Latter-day Saints; Young University
- Type: Private religious
- Active: April 5, 1892–August 18, 1894
- Founders: Willard Young, James E. Talmage
- Religious affiliation: The Church of Jesus Christ of Latter-day Saints
- Chairman: George Q. Cannon
- President: Willard Young
- Location: 225 West 200 North, Salt Lake City, Utah Territory, United States; 40.7734°N 111.8978°W
- Semesters held: Fall 1893–Spring 1894

The Church University (officially the University of the Church of Jesus Christ of Latter-day Saints, and known as Young University during its development) was a short-lived, private university in Salt Lake City, Utah Territory. Opened in 1893, it was meant to be the flagship institution of the education system run by the Church of Jesus Christ of Latter-day Saints (LDS Church), but closed after a single year of operation. Instead, church leaders encouraged their members to support the University of Utah. In later years, Brigham Young Academy in Provo, Utah would take on the role of the church's flagship school, evolving into Brigham Young University.

A building for the university was constructed in downtown Salt Lake City, which it shared with another of the church's educational institutions, the Deseret Museum. Following the university's closure, the building was used by the University of Utah, then West High School, and eventually became the long-time home of the city's Horace Mann Junior High School.

== Creation ==
=== Brigham Young's academies ===
Towards the end of Brigham Young's life, he endowed land for the establishment of three secondary schools in Utah. These schools, known as academies, were to be located in Salt Lake City, Provo, and Logan. Young's purpose was to develop schools where instruction would be both academic and religious. Brigham Young Academy in Provo and Brigham Young College in Logan were both quickly established, but formation of the school in Salt Lake City was delayed. This was due to several factors, including the death of Young and issues related to the administration of his estate, along with several of the trustees, who had been charged with the school's development, being unavailable due to personal circumstances.

This changed in September 1883, when Willard Young (a trustee who was also the son of Brigham Young), called a meeting of the board. During the meeting, the trustees decided to move forward with the school's establishment, but first wanted approval from John Taylor, Young's successor as LDS Church president. Taylor was largely opposed to the venture and while he eventually gave his permission, he refused to provide any church funding for the school. Soon after, Willard Young reported to Oregon on military orders, and no further progress on the school's establishment was made at the time. In 1886, Taylor approved the establishment of a different secondary school in the city, the Salt Lake Stake Academy (which has since evolved into Ensign College).

In 1888, Wilford Woodruff, successor to Taylor, established the General Church Board of Education and implemented a program to establish additional stake academies. These church academies would provide a secondary-school-level education in their respective communities and help to counter the mission schools run by other Christian faiths, which had the aim of "Christianizing" Mormon children.

=== Young University ===
As the church's education system grew, leaders intended that a university based in Salt Lake City would become the center of higher education for the faith, and act as the "parent school" over all other church-operated schools. Concerned with young people leaving the territory for higher education in the East, and knowing that the University of Deseret (currently the University of Utah), was under the control of the territory's legislature, church leaders realized they needed to establish this university themselves. Early indications were that the Salt Lake Stake Academy would fill that role, with its name being changed to LDS College in 1889. However, in May 1890, Woodruff wrote Willard Young asking him to resign from the military and return to Salt Lake City, to be president of a new university. In a meeting between Young and the First Presidency, it was decided to call the new church-funded school "Young University," and for the property originally set apart by Brigham Young for an academy in Salt Lake City to be transferred to the recently established board of the new school. The following year, church leadership asked James E. Talmage to work with Young as co-founder of the university, a moved criticized by the trustees of LDS College, where Talmage was serving as president. Nevertheless, Talmage accepted and he, along with Young, spent much of the following year organizing and preparing to the open the university.

=== The Church University ===
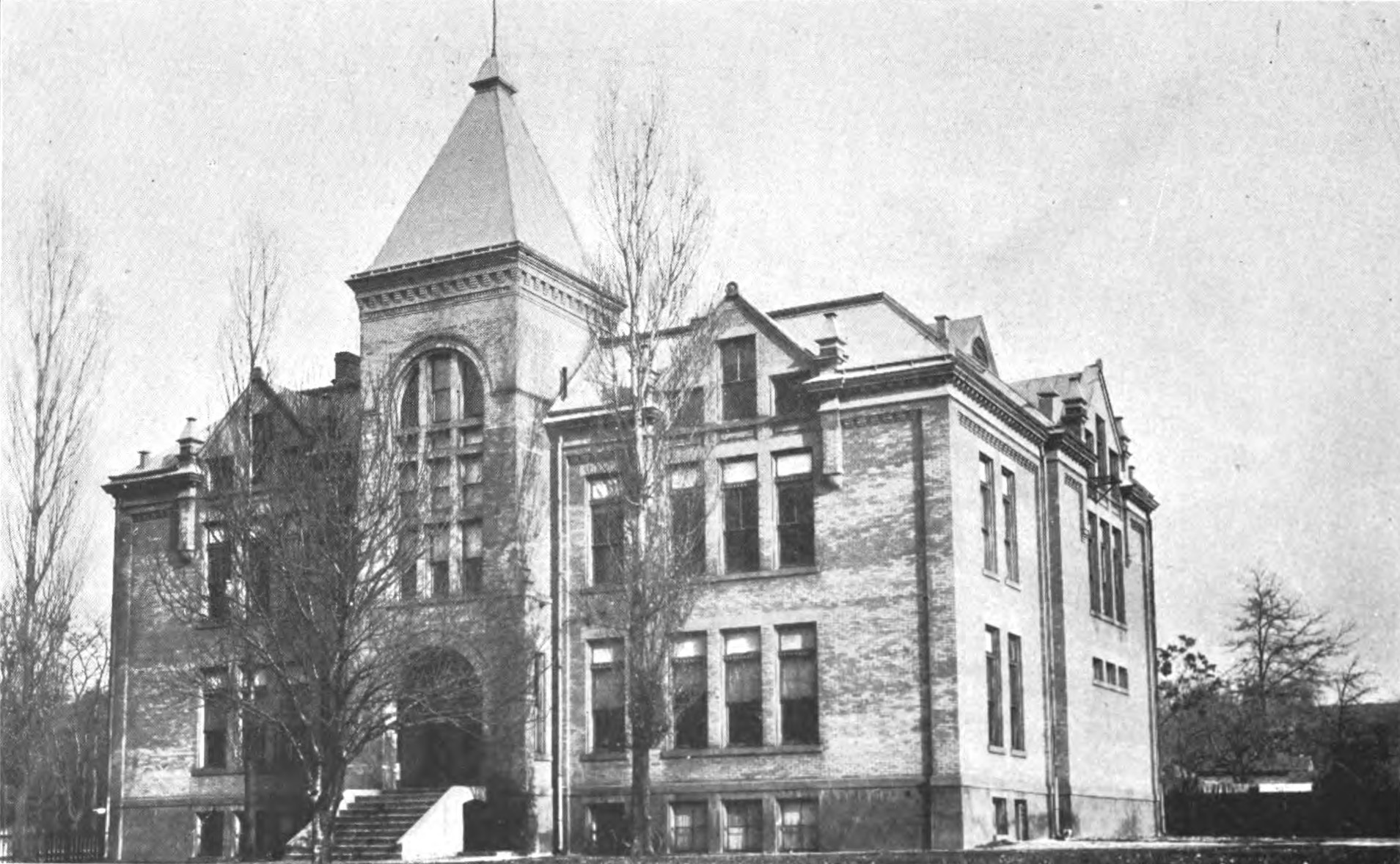
The Church University building, when it was being used by Salt Lake High School as its science building

At General Conference in 1892, a series of resolutions were read and accepted on April 4 and 5, officially establishing the school. The institution's name was established as The University of the Church of Jesus Christ of Latter-day Saints, but its common name was designated as the Church University. As preparations to open the school continued, the Panic of 1893 set in and the church's board of education considered delaying its first session due to the economic downturn. Talmage, wishing to open as planned, devised an arrangement in which only him one other teacher, Richard T. Haag, would be needed. The board accepted the plan, allowing school to commence.

The school opened its doors on September 25, 1893, and was officially dedicated with a prayer by George Q. Cannon on October 9, 1893. The small selection of classes offered were natural philosophy, chemistry, theology and German, with a regular attendance of 240–250 students in evening lectures.

== Closure ==
Among the reasons for the church establishing the university was its lack of influence over the University of Utah. But, soon after the Church University opened, it became apparent that between the economic situation in the country and the church's new school pulling away students, that the University of Utah would not survive. Representatives from the state university then met with church leaders to ask them to close the new university. In return for the closure, officials at the University of Utah agreed to make James E. Talmage, then at the Church University, their school's president, thus giving the church some degree of influence at the state-controlled university. Church officials agreed and also promised to encourage the faith's members to support the University of Utah. In later discussions, the church also decided to financially support the University of Utah directly, with an endowment of $60,000 (equivalent to $2,150,000 in 2025).

Official announcement of the Church University's permanent closure was made on August 18, 1894 in the Deseret Evening News. The Church University transferred its scientific equipment to the University of Utah, and then leased its building to the school for the next two years (and in 1896, gave the building to the University of Utah as final payment for the previously agreed upon endowment). The 18th Ward Square, which was the original land Brigham Young had given the school, was turned over by the remaining trustees to LDS College in 1901. The college then sold the property to help finance construction of its new campus on Main Street.

== Campus ==
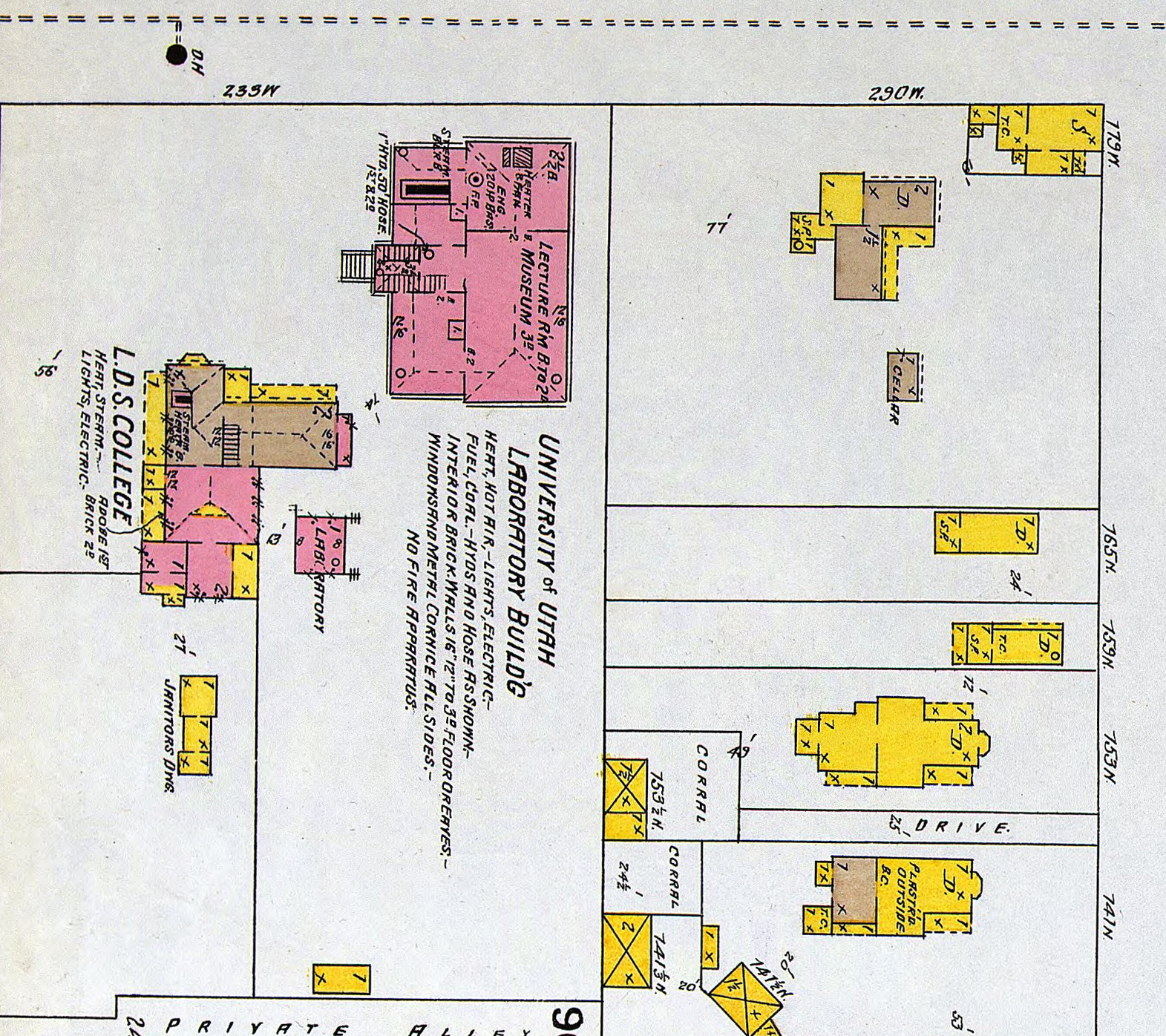
1898 Sanborn Map showing the former campus. At the time, the Church University building was being used by the University of Utah as its science/laboratory building.

When Brigham Young deeded land for his three academies, for the school in Salt Lake City, he set apart the plot known as the "18th Ward Square," near the 18th Ward meetinghouse. When it came time to establish the Church University, what was meant to be a temporary campus was established on property owned by LDS College rather than the 18th Ward Square. Since plans were already being considered to build a new structure for the Deseret Museum on the college's property, those plans were expanded to include classrooms for the university.

The building was constructed by the Salt Lake Literary and Scientific Association, a subsidiary of the church created to protect properties from confiscation by the federal government (via authority from the Edmunds–Tucker Act) during the anti-polygamy crusade. It consisted of three floors, plus a basement. Still a new technology, the structure was fitted with electricity, including a system that allowed Talmage to open each door of the science rooms using buttons at his desk. Offices, laboratories and classrooms filled the first two levels, while the third floor was home to the Deseret Museum.

=== Later usage ===
After the closure of the Church University, the structure was known as the Deseret Museum building. For two years it was leased to the University of Utah and used as its science/laboratory building (while the Deseret Museum remained on the third floor), before the Salt Lake Literary and Scientific Association transferred ownership of the edifice to the state-run university. In 1900, the museum became the sole occupant once the University of Utah moved from its downtown campus on Union Square to its present campus on the east bench of the valley. In 1901, after a fire damaged the building housing Salt Lake High School (later West High School), that school relocated to the recently vacated downtown campus of the University of Utah. The Deseret Museum building then became the science building of the high school.

After East High School was completed, decreasing the number of students at West High School, the science building housed a preparatory school called the Monroe School along with housing West Junior High School. In 1920, a large west wing was added to the school building. In 1934, the original Church University building, now acting as the east wing of the junior high, was heavily remodeled by the Federal Emergency Relief Administration to match the design of the 1920 west wing.

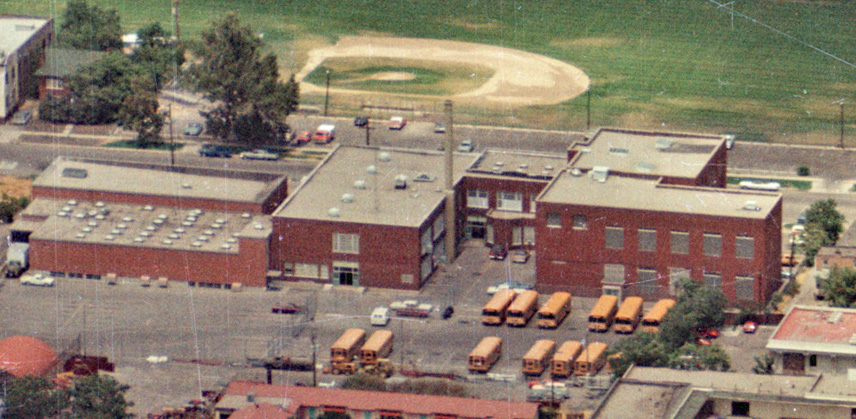
Horace Mann Junior High building; the Church University building is the top right section of the structure

In the 1930s, the school's name was changed from West Junior High to Horace Mann Junior High which operated until May 1973, when the school was closed. The building then housed an alternative/adult education school, known as Salt Lake Community High, until 1995. Finally, it temporarily housed West High School students while their building was undergoing seismic renovations in the late 1990s, before being torn down.

== See also ==
- Council House (Salt Lake City)

== Bibliography ==
- Quinn, D. Michael (Winter 1973). "The Brief Career of Young University at Salt Lake City". Utah Historical Quarterly. 41 (1). Utah State Historical Society: 69–89.
- Ricks, Brian William (December 2012). Closing the Church University in 1894: Embracing or Accommodating Secularized Education (dissertation). Provo, Utah: Brigham Young University.
- Van Leer, Twila (October 17, 1995). "Dream of Young University Failed To Become a Reality". Deseret News. Salt Lake City.
- Wilkinson, Ernest L., ed. (1975). Brigham Young University: The First One Hundred Years. Vol. 1. Provo, Utah: Brigham Young University Press. ISBN 0-8425-0708-6.
