= West High School (Utah) =

School in Salt Lake City, Utah, United States

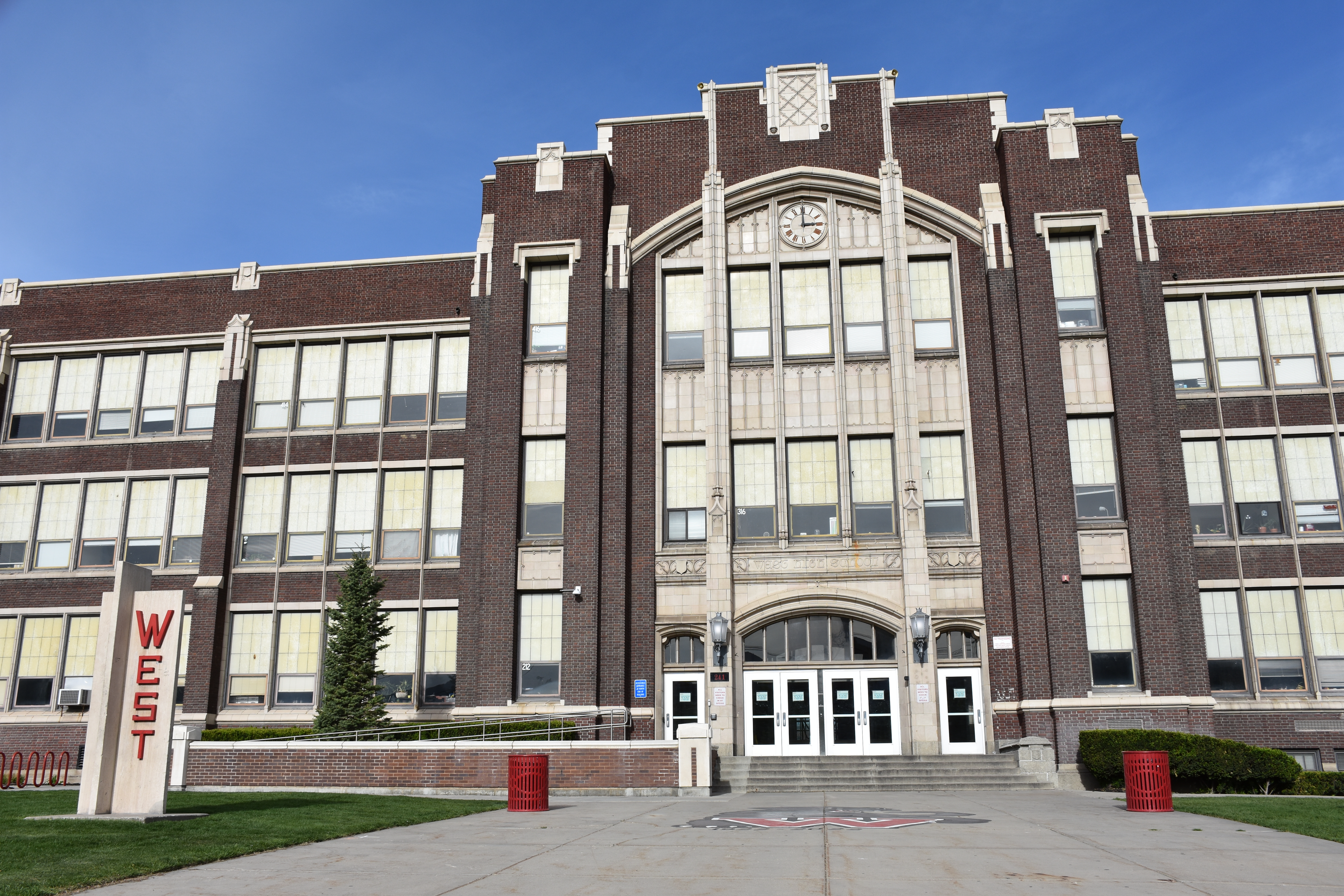
- Main entrance from 300 West

Location
- 241 N 300 W Salt Lake City, Utah; United States; 40°46′29″N 111°54′02″W

Information
- Type: Public secondary
- Motto: The School of Scholars and Champions
- Established: 1890
- Oversight: Salt Lake City School District (SLCSD)
- Principal: Wayne Culley
- Teaching staff: 112.82 (on an FTE basis)
- Grades: 9–12 (7-8 for ELP)
- Enrollment: 2,505 (2023–2024)
- Student to teacher ratio: 22.20
- Colors: Red and black
- Athletics conference: 5A Region 4
- Mascot: Panthers
- Newspaper: The Red & Black
- Website: Official website

West High School is a public high school in Salt Lake City, Utah. A part of the Salt Lake City School District, the school serves students in the western part of the city. Founded in 1890 as Salt Lake High School, it is one of the oldest public high schools in Utah. (Note: Like Salt Lake High School, classes at Ogden High School were also begun in September 1890. Private high schools, such as the LDS Church's academy system, were in operation prior to public high schools in Utah.) As of 2026, the school is housed in its historic 1922 building on Salt Lake City's Union Square, however ground was broken for a new building in March 2026.

With an enrollment of over 2,500 students, its athletic teams compete in the Utah High School Activities Association's region six of the 5A classification. The school's colors are red and black, with a black panther as the mascot.

== History ==
West High School traces its history back to 1890, when two public high schools were established in Salt Lake City. The East Side High School opened in rooms at a local Lutheran Church on September 22, 1890. The Fourteenth District building, which housed classes for the West Side High School, did not open until December 10 (on account of its construction going longer than anticipated). The two high schools were then combined into Salt Lake City High School during January 1891, which held its classes in the Fourteenth District building.

The high school outgrew its space in the Fourteenth District building and was moved to the Clayton building on South Temple street in 1892. In 1898, the high school moved again, this time into a newly constructed building that was part of the Oregon Shortline Railroad Company complex on Pierpont Avenue. The school remained in this location, until a large fire on September 10, 1901 destroyed several buildings and damaged the structure used by the high school.

Former buildings

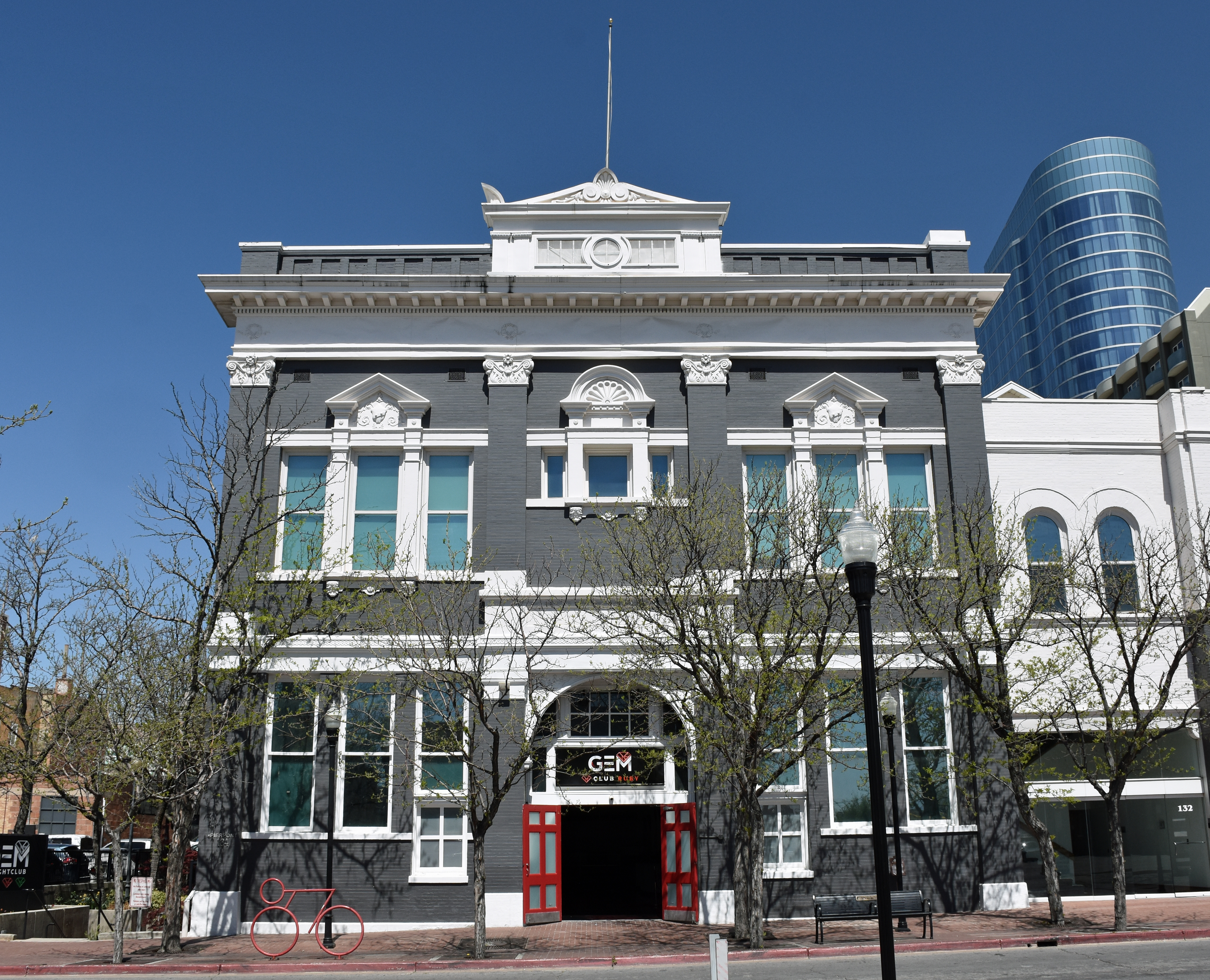
Pierpont Avenue building, housed the high school from 1898 to 1901

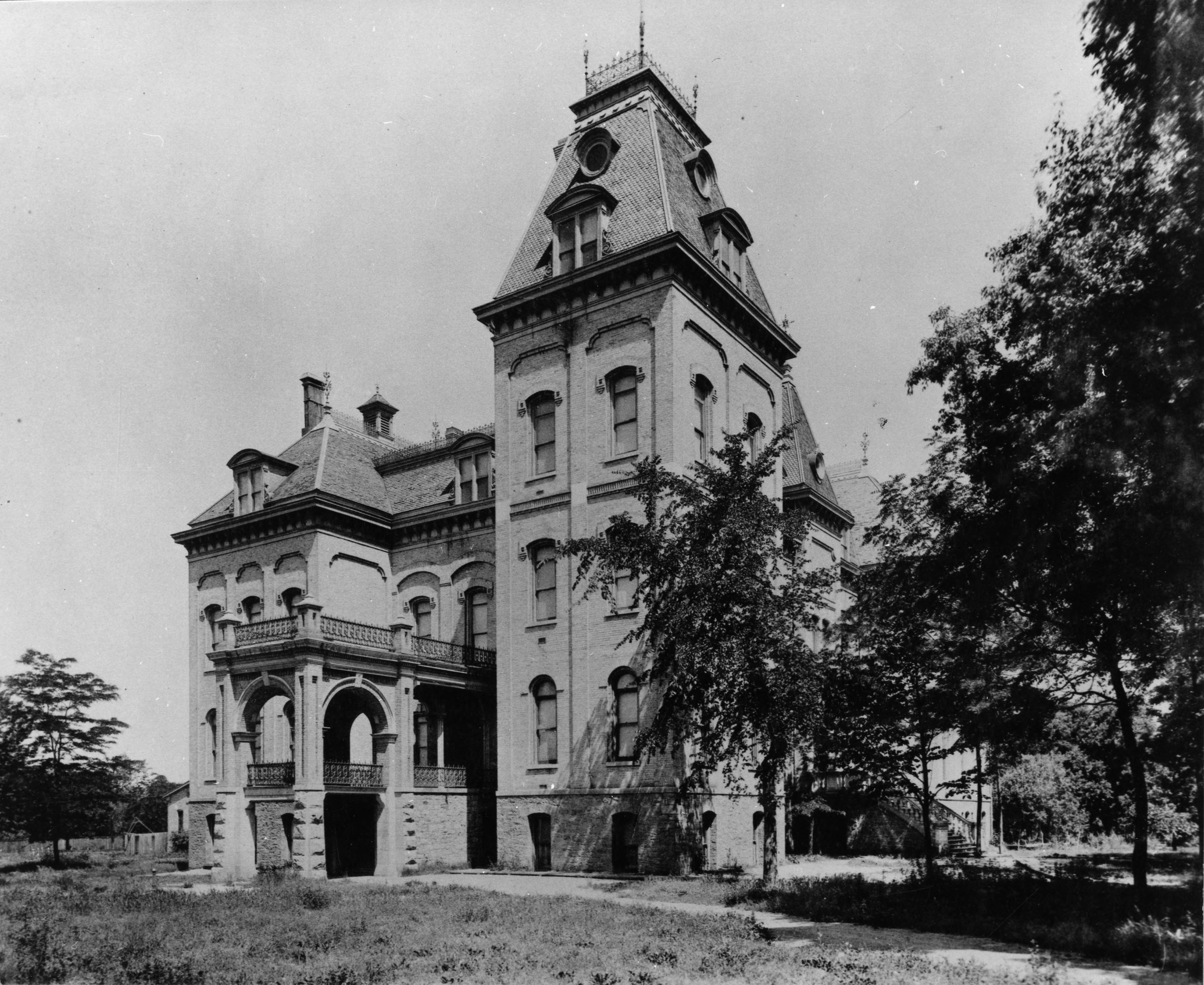
Old University of Utah main building on Union Square, housed the high school from 1901 to 1921

Immediately after the fire, arrangements were made to the move the high school to Union Square. Here it would occupy the recently vacated University of Utah main building, along with making use of the nearby Deseret Museum building (originally built for the Church University).

Beginning in fall 1902, the high school was once again split between the West Side High School and the East Side High School. The west high school remained on Union Square, while the new high school opened in the Bryant School building, just east of downtown. However, the split was short lived, and the schools were combined in summer 1905. In May 1914, the East High School building was opened, officially splitting Salt Lake High School between east and west.

The old University of Utah main building was demolished in 1921 and a new, three-story high school building opened in 1922. Due to the current building's age, in 2024, voters approved a bond to fund construction of a new structure. A groundbreaking ceremony for the new building, which will move the high school across the street to a new block, was held March 19, 2026.

In November 2019, then-principal Ford White was suspended after he used a student vehicle to drive two intoxicated female students to the residence of one of the students, rather than following district policy of reporting intoxication to law enforcement—a decision which "shocked some of his colleagues" who reported the action. White claimed he was trying to prevent the students from getting involved with the legal system in accordance with restorative justice. He was placed on paid administrative leave pending investigation and ultimately fired from the job in early 2020, and White's professional license was suspended for one year. About 500 students staged a walk-out in support of White.

=== Manual and technical training ===
Beginning with the 1902–1903 school year, the local board of education established manual training. This training was meant to offer practical skills and vocational training, as opposed to the strictly academic training offered by the school system up to that time. On the west side of the city, these classes were held in the Union School building, also located on Union Square. The growth of these programs would result in the construction of the Technical High School from 1910 to 1912. There is some indication that after the opening of East High School, the West High School was meant to be strictly a technical school.

== Athletics ==
West High has had multiple state sports championships, most prominently twenty-one for football (1898, 1899, 1900, 1901, 1902, 1903, 1904, 1905, 1908, 1909, 1911, 1912, 1913, 1915, 1925, 1927, 1973, 1975, 1980, 1984 and 1992); nine for boys' track (1912, 1922, 1929, 1932, 1933, 1951, 1953, 1954 and 1957); and four for boys' tennis (1992, 1996, 1997 and 2002).

The school maintains a Hall of Fame for prominent athletes.

== Notable alumni ==
- Parley Baer, American actor
- Paul Bloomquist, American pilot and officer
- Shannon Bryner Hale, Author
- Clayton Christensen, Harvard Business School professor and bestselling author
- Nathan Chen, Figure skater
- Tony Finau, Professional golfer
- Helen Foster Snow, American journalist
- Earl Holding, Owner of Sinclair Oil and Grand America Hotel
- Tom C. Korologos, US Ambassador
- Leonidas Ralph Mecham, U.S. Court Administrator
- Thomas S. Monson, Former president of the LDS Church
- Dick Nemelka, Professional basketball player in the ABA
- Harold Ross, Co-founder of The New Yorker magazine
- George Von Elm, Professional golfer
- D. Frank Wilkins, Utah Supreme Court Justice
- Mark H. Willes, CEO of the LA Times and General Mills
- Dan Wells, author

== See also ==
- List of high schools in Utah
- List of school districts in Utah
