= Hix-Blackwell House =

Historic home in South Carolina

Coordinates: 34°29′41″N 82°00′55″W

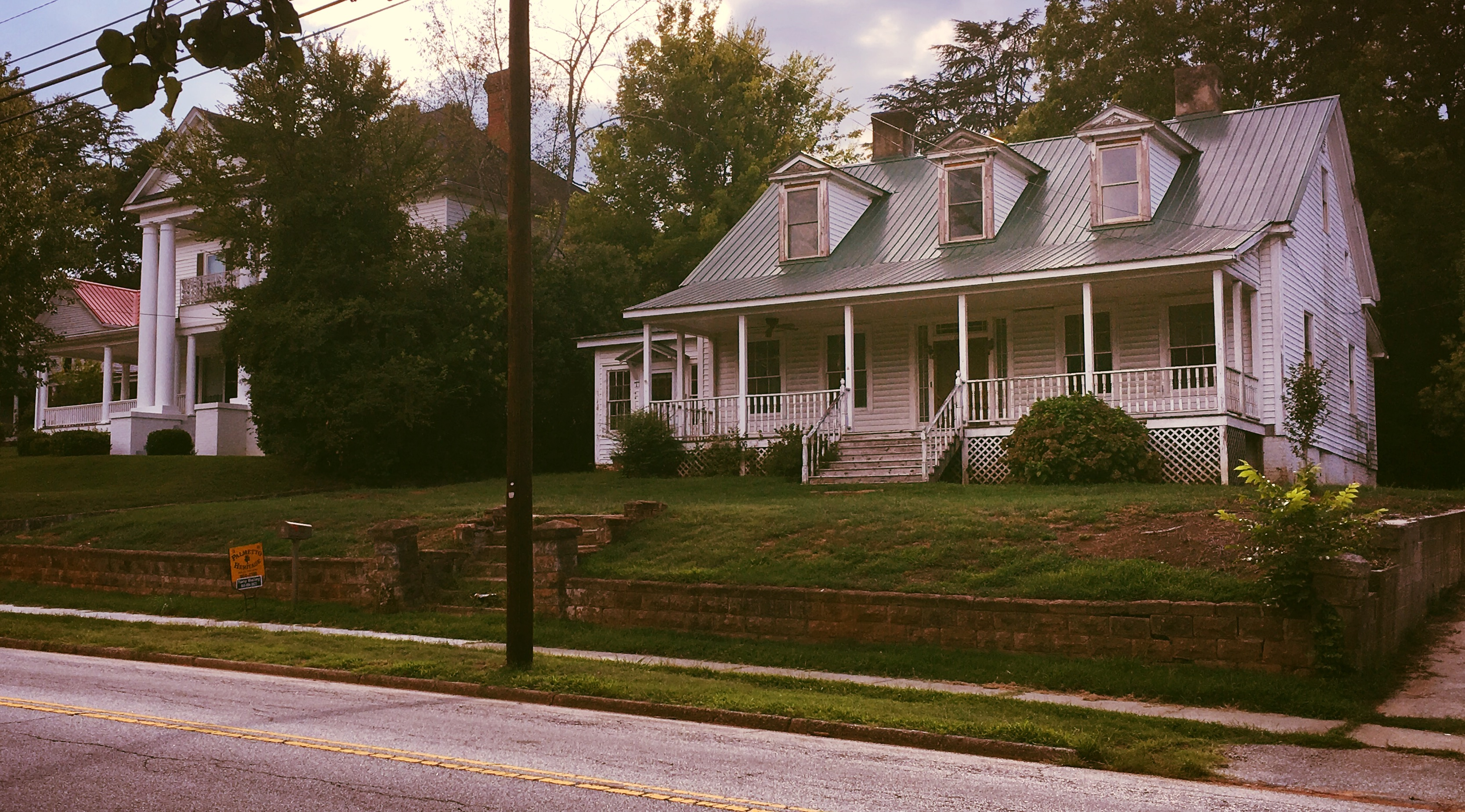
Hix-Blackwell House in 2016

The Hix-Blackwell House is among the oldest dwellings in the U.S. city of Laurens, South Carolina. This house has been the residence of one of the earliest merchants in the city of Laurens, American Civil War veterans, a prominent lawyer and legislator, and their families. It is a key contributing resource for the South Harper Historic District.

== The Hix Family residence ==
The house was likely built by Edward Hix (1792 – 1882), a veteran of the War of 1812 and a native Virginian. After spending some time in Union County, South Carolina, Edward bought the lot where the house is located from Robert Cresswell in January 1818. Cresswell was a prominent citizen, not just of Laurens, but of the state, having served as Lt. Governor from 1814 to 1816 (Lieutenant Governors of South Carolina). Hix himself was a coach and wagon manufacturer, and he also operated a furniture factory and grist mill on Hix Creek, just below the site of the house near the present-day Laurens County Emergency Services Complex, also on South Harper Street.

It is not known exactly when the house was constructed. It is possible that the house predates the purchase of the lot on which it sits by the Hix family. The deed recording the property transfer and describing the premises states that there was a "small house built on the said lott (sic) by James Bruster." However, it is currently believed that this may refer to an older, smaller dwelling which, according to Sanborne Fire Insurance maps was present in 1906 but had been demolished by 1912. However, it is clear that the house had been built and established well before 1849. In an advertisement in The Laurensville Herald dated August 17, 1849, Edward Hix offers to sell a "valuable and desirable house and lot in the Village of Laurens containing two acres with a good well of water with all necessary outbuildings." Apparently Edward Hix was not able to find a suitable buyer for the property, and the house remained in the Hix family for another generation.

In addition to his contributions as a veteran and carriage maker, Edward Hix served as one of the first Aldermen of the City of Laurens, serving from January 1846, just after the City was incorporated by the SC General Assembly in December 1845. One of his sons, Jesse, served as the City’s first Clerk/Treasurer.

The house was also the home of Edward's sons: Edward Melville Hix And Jesse Scott Hix, and William Preston Hix. While Preston "Press" Hix may not have remained in Laurens, he may be the most unusual of the brothers. As a young man, before the Civil War, he became an accomplished artist, winning local awards for his pictures. He served in the Third South Carolina Infantry, and after being discharged, he worked for a photographer in Columbia, South Carolina, taking photographs and using his portrait skills to colorize them. He eventually became a partner in this firm, known as Wearn & Hix. One of his most famous photographs is that of Robert Smalls, leader of a slave rebellion and United States Congressman from South Carolina following the Civil War. This portrait is now kept in the National Gallery in Washington, D.C. His portraiture skills eventually allowed him to move north to New York and befriend prominent national figures, including Gen. P.G.T. Beauregard, of whom he painted a full-length portrait. While in New York, he became acquainted with Thomas Edison, eventually becoming a trusted friend and business associate. He worked as an agent for the Edison Company, and was responsible for the installation of a $2 million dollar lighting system for the city of Philadelphia in 1884.

While their younger brother Preston painted portraits, Edward M. and Jesse worked in the family business, manufacturing wagons, buggies, carriages, as well as mantels, window sashes, and other furniture items. This family business venture is significant because it represents the coming of the industrial age to this small South Carolina town. The Laurensville Herald of December 20, 1850 reports that Edward Hix (the elder) had "purchased the lot behind Mr. S. R. Todd's store from Saxon and Farley and is erecting a steam saw and gristmill." By January 17, 1851, the paper reported that Hix, who had again been elected a "Warden of Laurensville," had "purchased the necessary material and machinery and is erecting buildings to put up a steam factory on the lot below Mr. Todd's store consisting of a sawmill, gristmill, planing and mortising machine and a variety of other smaller machines." The Herald goes on to editorialize a bit, stating, "It will not be long before the dark smoke of the steam horse will be peering aloft over our hitherto quiet little village." These two brothers purchased the business and other property from their father on May 24, 1869.

Edward M. Hix (1832-1905), who owned his own house on West Main Street in Laurens (near the site of the present-day First United Methodist Church) eventually moved to Johnston, South Carolina, and was the fourth settler of that town. His departure from Laurens left Jesse Hix (1826-1905) in the South Harper house with his family. Jesse's first wife, Mary Helen Hix, died in 1881, and the couple was childless at that time. However, he was soon remarried to Clara Harlow Boyd (1863-1952), and the couple raised five children in the home. Jesse remained in the house until his death in March 1905, and at the time of his death he was the oldest resident of Laurens. Jesse and Harlow's daughter, Jessie, married Augustus Mahafee, a grocer who operated a store on the Laurens Public Square. Jessie and Augustus and their children remained in the home with Harlow Hix until 1918, when they moved to a newer residence on West Main Street and sold the home to Homer S. Blackwell and his wife.

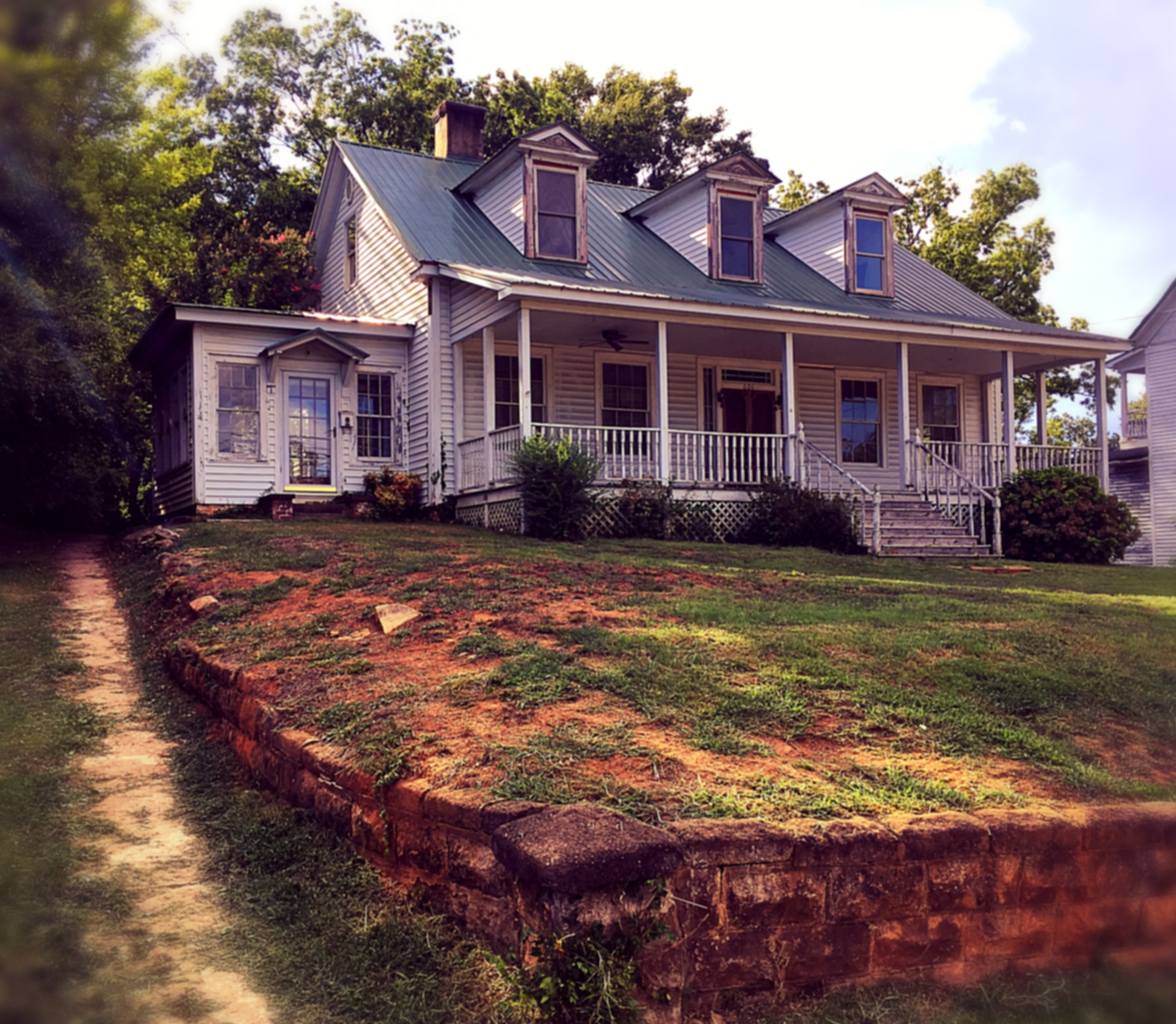
Hix-Blackwell House, front facade showing Blackwell sun-room addition

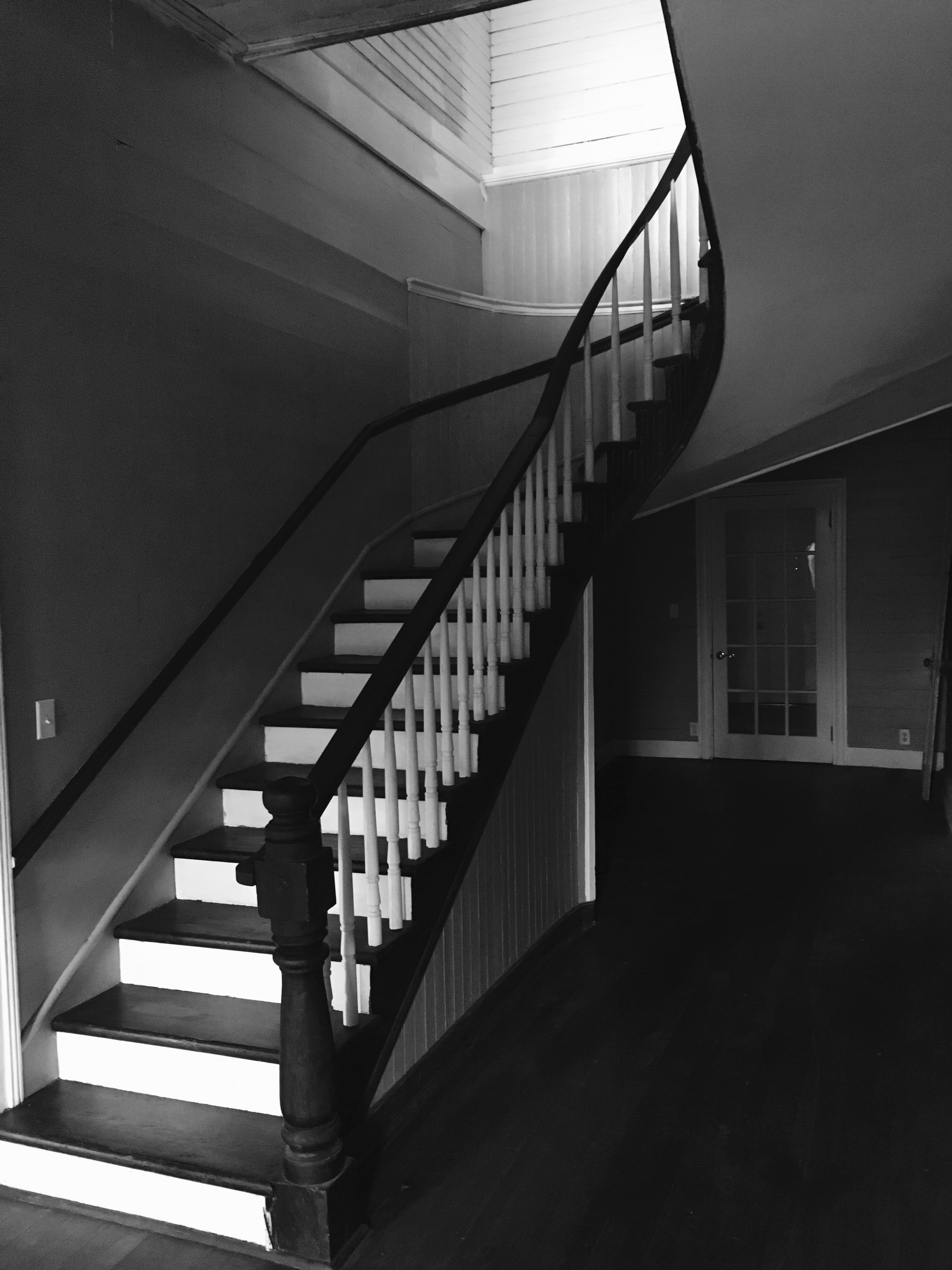
Hix-Blackwell House Staircase

== The Blackwell Family Residence & Beyond ==
Second owner of the house was Homer S. Blackwell, a prominent lawyer and state solicitor and member of the South Carolina House of Representatives from 1913 to 1914. With a growing law practice located in the original Palmetto Bank Building (ca. 1904) and having served in the State House of Representatives, Blackwell and his wife were able to purchase the historic home of the Hix family. As a young couple, they earned money on the side by taking in boarders, as evidenced by the presence of two boarders in their home at the time of the 1920 Federal census. Blackwell and his wife, Jeannie, raised a family in the home and were active members in the community as he grew to become a respected member of the Laurens Bar and she taught school.

During the time the Blackwell's owned the home, Homer Blackwell was involved in the aftermath of the notorious lynching of Joe Stewart, and worked to bring to justice those who had committed this crime of hate. After showing character in this incident fairly early in his legal career, Blackwell continued to serve the public through the practice of law.

Like the first builder and first owner of the house, Blackwell had a connection to the City of Laurens. Blackwell served as City Attorney for the City of Laurens during the late 1950s until his death in November 1960 at age 83. Jeannie Blackwell continued to live in the home until her death in 1975.

At this point, and to a greater extent afterward, the home suffered from a lack of maintenance and care. It continued to fall into disrepair until the early 1990s when an attempt was made to modernize the home and repair much of the damage caused by water leaks, termites, and the passage of time. However, with the exception of removing the stoop and restoring a porch which spanned the entire front facade, the repairs made in the 1990s were not made with care and respect for the historic character of the home.

Today, work is ongoing to restore the home and return it to its former beauty, respecting its place as home to one of the City of Laurens' founding families and some of the most influential figures in the city's history.

== Architectural features ==
The house is described on the National Register of Historic Places as a "one-and-one-half story, frame residence, sheathed in weatherboarding. The front slope of the metal, gable roof is pierced by three pedimented, gabled dormers. The main entrance, which is centered, has double doors, sidelights, and transom. A porch which extended across the facade was removed and replaced by a gabled portico in the 1920s."

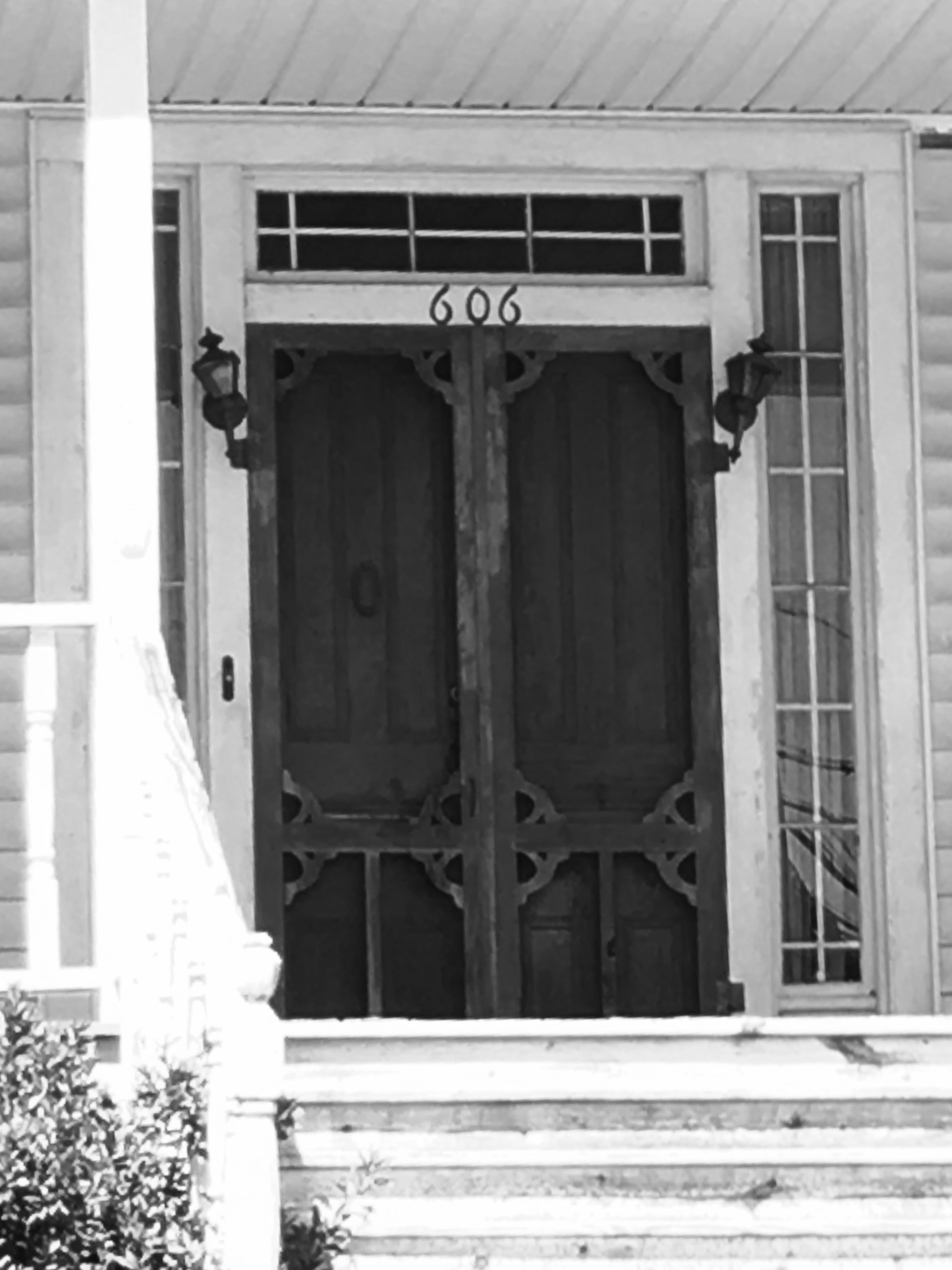
Hix-Blackwell House front door showing 19th c. decorative fretwork

The home also has a number of other distinctive features which were not noted in the National Register description. The pedimented Pediment gabled dormers mentioned feature detailed wood fretwork, typical of the early decades of the 19th century. This wooden ornamentation is also present on the double screen doors and are likely an early, if not original, feature of the house. The interior of the home features a wide central hallway which showcases a dramatic winding staircase. The rooms on the first floor feature 12 ft. ceilings and two centrally located chimneys allow for each of the four principal first floor rooms to have its own fireplace. These fireplaces, which were originally configured to burn wood were later modified to use coal, and later blocked off altogether for use of propane/gas heaters.

The frame of the house is evidence of its extreme (relative) age. The beams which support the house are milled lumber, some measuring 8"x12" and fitted together with traditional post-and-beam construction techniques and pegged together with hand-shaped pegs.

During the period in which the Blackwell family owned the house, older victorian-style homes fell out of fashion and simpler colonial styling was preferred. Unfortunately, the home's original porch was removed in the 1920s, and it is likely that much of the original ornamentation which may have adorned the capitals of the porch columns and the railings was discarded. In place of the large porch, the family built a simple gabled portico which was present at the time the house was listed on the National Register in 1986. They also added a sunroom to the South side of the home. In recent years, the expansive front porch has been restored to the home so it more closely resembles its antebellum appearance, though additional restoration is required to complete the task.

By 1906, it appears that the home had a kitchen on the southwest corner and a small covered porch which stood just behind the back door of the central hallway. There was also a separate, small dwelling directly behind the house as well a water well and another outbuilding (likely a stable and/or carriage shed) on the north side of the property. By 1912, the entire rear portion of the house had enclosed by an addition with a metal shed roof. This addition was likely added to provide for indoor bathroom facilities. Gone too, by 1912, was the small dwelling, which may have been the original dwelling present when the lot was sold to the Hix family in 1818. Additional study is necessary to determine the nature, location, and age of these separate structures.

While the home's age has not been clearly determined, circumstantial evidence from the property transfer record, architectural features of the home, and contemporary accounts indicate that the house was likely constructed from 1818 to the early 1820s. What is certain is that the home is one of the oldest, and one of the few surviving antebellum structures in the city of Laurens.
