= Young University =

Young University may refer to various schools named after Brigham Young, including:

- Brigham Young College, a former secondary school and junior college in Logan, Utah
- Brigham Young University, in Provo, Utah
- Church University, a former university in Salt Lake City, Utah (known as "Young University" during development)
