= D. Frank Wilkins =

American judge

Associate Justice of the Utah Supreme Court
- In office 1976–1980
- Appointed by: Cal Rampton

Personal details
- Born: April 25, 1924 Tooele, Utah
- Died: January 2, 2006 (aged 81)
- Education: George Washington University Law School; University of Utah

D. Frank Wilkins (April 25, 1924 – January 2, 2006) was a justice of the Utah Supreme Court from 1976 to 1980.

He was born in Tooele, Utah on April 25, 1924. He attended West High School and the University of Utah in Salt Lake City, then went to George Washington University Law School. After law school, Wilkins was a Salt Lake County Deputy County Attorney, and then in private law practice. In 1961, Wilkins was elected chair of the Utah Democratic Party.

In 1967, Governor Cal Rampton appointed Wilkins as a 3rd District Court Judge, where he served until 1974. Rampton elevated Wilkins to the Supreme Court in 1976. One notable decision Wilkins wrote while on the supreme court upheld the death sentence of Pierre Selby, one of the convicted 'Hi-Fi' murderers. He resigned from the court in 1980 and returned to private practice.

In his private practice, he was one of the defense lawyers in the murder trial of avowed racist Joseph Paul Franklin. He was still working at the time of his death in 2006.
