= Kate Sanborn =

American author, teacher and lecturer

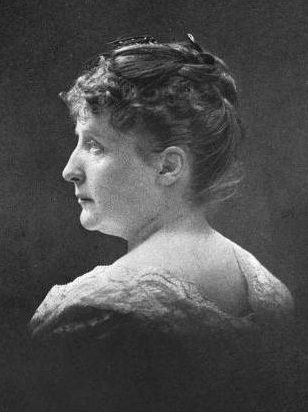
- Born: July 11, 1839; Hanover, New Hampshire, U.S.
- Died: July 9, 1917 (aged 77)
- Occupations: author, teacher, lecturer
- Relatives: Edwin David Sanborn, Ebenezer Webster, Daniel Webster
- Writing career
- Language: English

Kate Sanborn (July 11, 1839 - July 9, 1917) was an American author, teacher and lecturer. Also a reviewer, compiler, essayist, and farmer, Sanborn was famous for her cooking and housekeeping.

== Early years and education ==
Katherine Abbott Sanborn was born in Hanover, New Hampshire, July 11, 1839. Her father was the educator Edwin David Sanborn, who occupied the chair of Latin and English literature, at Dartmouth College, for nearly fifty years, In 1859, he accepted the Latin professorship and presidency of Washington University in St. Louis, returning four years later to the chair of oratory and literature at Dartmouth, which he held until he retired from active work. Her mother was Mary Ann (Webster) Sanborn, daughter of Ezekiel Webster, of Boscawen, New Hampshire. Sanborn was a descendant of Captain Ebenezer Webster, the Revolutionary hero, and grand-niece of Daniel Webster.

Sanborn was educated primarily at home by her father, although tutors were employed for mathematics instruction. She began studying Latin at the age of eight and continued until leaving home to support herself. According to contemporary accounts, her Latin studies extended beyond a typical college curriculum and involved years of translation, scanning, vocabulary study, and work on phrasing. She was also required to memorize portions of prose or poetry daily and complete written descriptive exercises. Family activities reportedly included the use of quotations and anecdotes as part of her instruction. Biographical sources state that this educational approach contributed to the development of her memory and language skills. Her daily writing exercises, conducted under her father's criticism and guidance, emphasized word choice, expression, and the use of synonyms. Contemporary accounts further described the instruction as being shaped by a close relationship between Sanborn and her father rather than by a formal or burdensome teaching structure.

At eleven, she earned US$3 for a little story her father sent to a child's paper, Well-Spring.

== Career ==
At seventeen, she supported herself by her written work.

She inherited a love for teaching, and began that employment in her father's house, then went with him to St. Louis, Missouri where she taught in Mary Institute, at a salary of US$500per year, of which she was very proud. After, she taught elocution at Packer Collegiate Institute in Brooklyn, so well that Henry Ward Beecher said, "There used to be a few prize pumpkins here, but now each pupil is doing good work." At the same time she gave twenty lectures in New York City each season upon such subjects as "Bachelor Authors," " Punch as a Reformer," "Literary Gossips," "Spinster Authors of England," and so forth. She lectured in public on literary history and allied subjects. Her lecturing career, which last for 20 years, began in the drawing room of her friend Anne Lynch Botta.

In its early days, Smith College called her to teach English literature, and here she created the "Round Table Series of Literature," once published and used by many teachers. No one could go over this collection of complete and exact tables without knowing English letters correctly nor look at one diagram five minutes unprofitably. It showed marvellous power of concentration and "monumental drudgery." During her three years at Smith, Sanborn lectured in Springfield, Massachusetts at Anice Potter Terhune's home, and in many towns near the college. Leaving Smith, she went on a lecturing tour through the West, and met success everywhere.

Returning, Sanborn began teaching in New York City, and also lecturing, first in Edith Minturn Stokes's parlor, till, outgrowing it, she moved to rooms of the Young Women's Christian Association, and finally to those in Dr. Howard Crosby's church, speaking to large audiences there. This work was reported weekly in the Tribune, World, Sun, and Times. For several years, she reviewed books for the Club Room Department in The Galaxy. Dr. Josiah Gilbert Holland gave her the Bric-a-brac Department in Scribner's Magazine, and at this time, she met a class of married women at Mrs. Holland's every week, condensing and discussing new books. Meanwhile, she was an individual and potent factor in New York social and literary life. At Mary Elizabeth Wilson Sherwood's—or in any place where wit and wisdom gathered—she was at home, unpretending, picturesque, humorous.

Sanborn was the originator of Current Event classes in many of the literary clubs, which became common in many cities of the United States in the form of Current Topics classes. She wrote over 40 lectures, but among her best-known works were Adopting an Abandoned Farm, and Abandoning an Adopted Farm, Witty Records of her original ideas regarding farming, which she put into practice upon an abandoned farm which she purchased near Boston. Some of her other books were Home Pictures of English Poets, A Truthful Woman in Southern California, Vanity and Insanity; Shadows of Genius, Purple and Gold, Grandmother's Garden, and My Literary Zoo. She was instrumental in gathering and publishing a valuable historical work on New Hampshire.

In 1885, she published an anthology, The Wit of Women, in response to an ongoing debate in literary circles as to whether women had a sense of humor. Although she initially had difficulty finding humorous writing by women as such works were hardly anthologized at the time, the book she finally put together was so successful that it was reprinted multiple times.

Sanborn wrote reviews for the National Magazine. She also edited calendars and holiday books. Calendars were her recreation. "Our Calendar" gave to each date a few lines from an American author. She also created "Cupid's," "Children's," "Sunshine," "Rainbow," "Starlight," and "Indian Summer" calendars.

== Personal life ==
She lived with her sister, Mrs. Paul Babcock, at Montclair, New Jersey, or in New York, some part of each winter; but her home was at Breezy Meadows, in Medway, Massachusetts, where she "adopted" an abandoned farm, which later she deserted for a farm only a short distance beyond it, on the opposite side of the road, where she settled down to agriculture, hospitality, and authorship. At Breezy Meadows, Sanborn was delighted to entertain her friends in large sunny rooms, with books everywhere.

Sanborn was the first president of New Hampshire's Daughters, an association of women born in New Hampshire, but living in Massachusetts and New Hampshire.

== Style and themes ==
According to Howe & Graves (1904):—"There is nothing tempestuous or gusty about her composition, yet it is full of anecdote, spirit, wit — keen thrusts in plenty, but without spite, worded to a nicety, but never shorn of strength."

== Selected works ==
- Home Pictures of English Poets, for Fireside and Schoolroom (1869)
- Grandma's Garden, with Many Original Poems (1882)
- Kate Sanborn's Literature Lessons (1882)
- Purple and Gold (1882)
- Year of Sunshine (1884)
- Wit of Women (1885)
- Vanity and Insanity of Genius (1886)
- Adopting an Abandoned Farm (1891)
- Truthful Woman in Southern California (1893)
- Abandoning an Adopted Farm (1894)
- My Literary Zoo (1896)
- Starlight Calendar (1898)
- My Favorite Lectures of Long Ago, for Friends Who Remember (1898)
- Tact, and Other Essays (1899)
- Old Time Wall Papers (1905)
- Hunting Indians in a Taxi-cab (1911)
- Memories and Anecdotes (1915)
- Educated Dogs of To-day (1916)
