= Technical High School (Salt Lake City) =

Former school building in Salt Lake City, Utah, US

- Formerly listed on the U.S. National Register of Historic Places
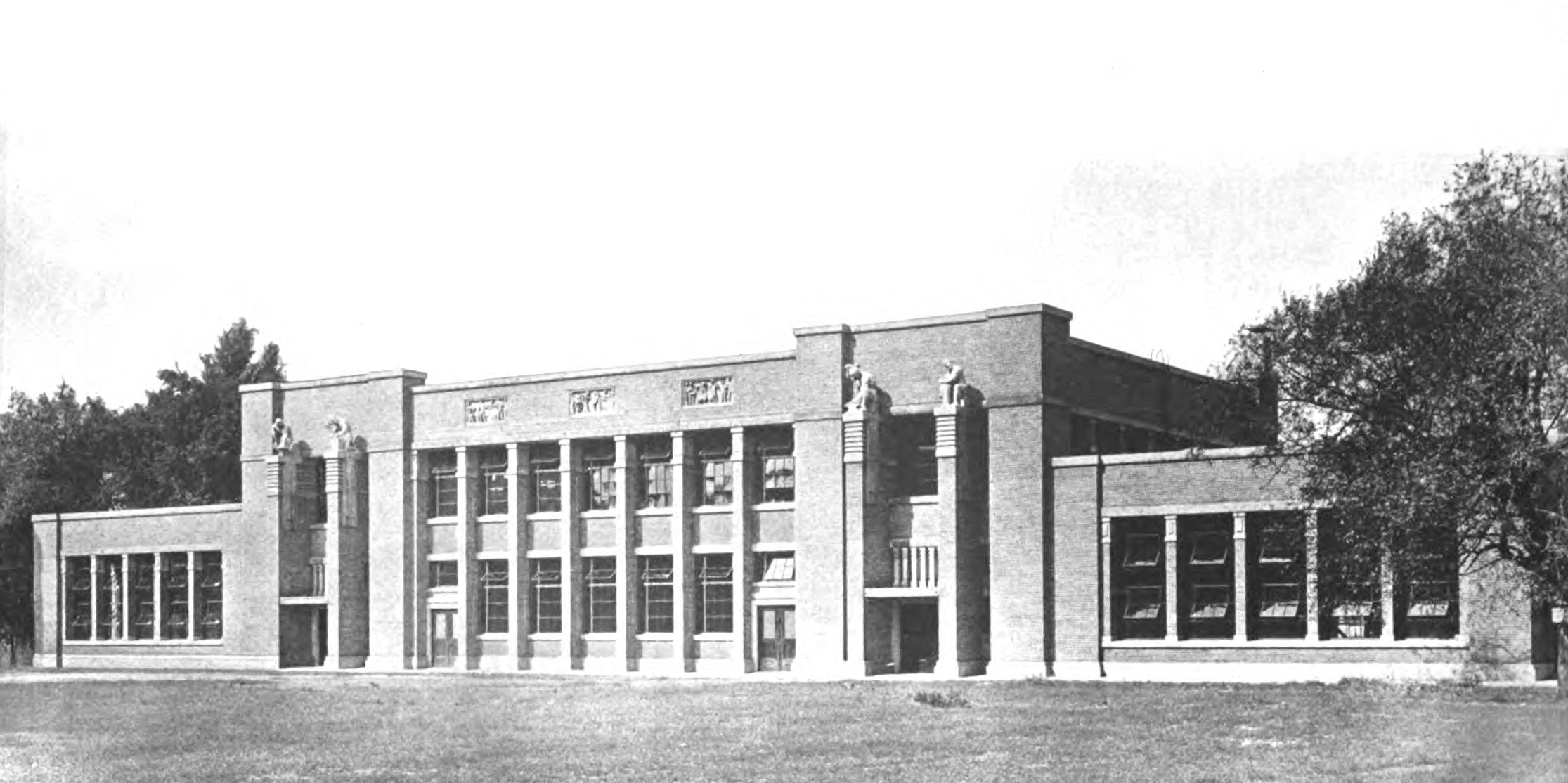
- The school building, as pictured in Architectural Forum, April 1917
- Interactive map of Technical High School
- Location: 241 North 300 West; Salt Lake City, Utah
- Coordinates: 40°46′29.66″N 111°54′7.37″W
- Built: 1910–1912
- Architect: Cannon & Fetzer
- Architectural style: Prairie Style
- Demolished: 1990s
- NRHP reference No.: 80003934

Significant dates
- Added to NRHP: February 19, 1980
- Removed from NRHP: 2001

The Technical High School (also known as the manual training, industrial arts, or tech building) was a historic school building in Salt Lake City, Utah on the campus of West High School at Union Square. Constructed from 1910 to 1912, the structure was built to house the vocational and practical training offered by the local public school system.

Once the best example of a Prairie Style building in Utah, it was listed on the National Register of Historic Places in 1980, but was removed after the structure was demolished in the 1990s.

== History ==
The Salt Lake Board of Education had introduced manual training in 1903, and the growth of the program resulted in the construction of the Technical High School several years later.

During the planning of East High School, it was reported in local newspapers that when the east school was completed, it would absorb all academic high-school-level classes and in turn the old west campus would become a strictly technical school, with the Technical High School as its main building. There is some indication that the school (as an institution) may have operated independently for a short time, before being absorbed by West High School.

== Building ==
Construction of the building was started in 1910 and, following delays, was partially opened in September 1911. In early 1912, the building was completed.

Designed by Cannon & Fetzer, the Prairie Style building's architecture was influenced by Frank Lloyd Wright's Larkin Administration Building. The structure was built of reinforced concrete and veneered with bluff-colored brick. The exterior included several sculptures and bas-reliefs of trade workers created by Utah-born artist Mahonri Young. Inside were spaces for woodworking, machinery, a forge, and a foundry. In 1920, additions for more shops (such as auto repair and electrical) were built.

In the 1990s, the building was demolished, although some of Young's sculptures were spared.
