= South Harper Historic District =

Historic district in South Carolina, United States

- U.S. National Register of Historic Places
- U.S. Historic district
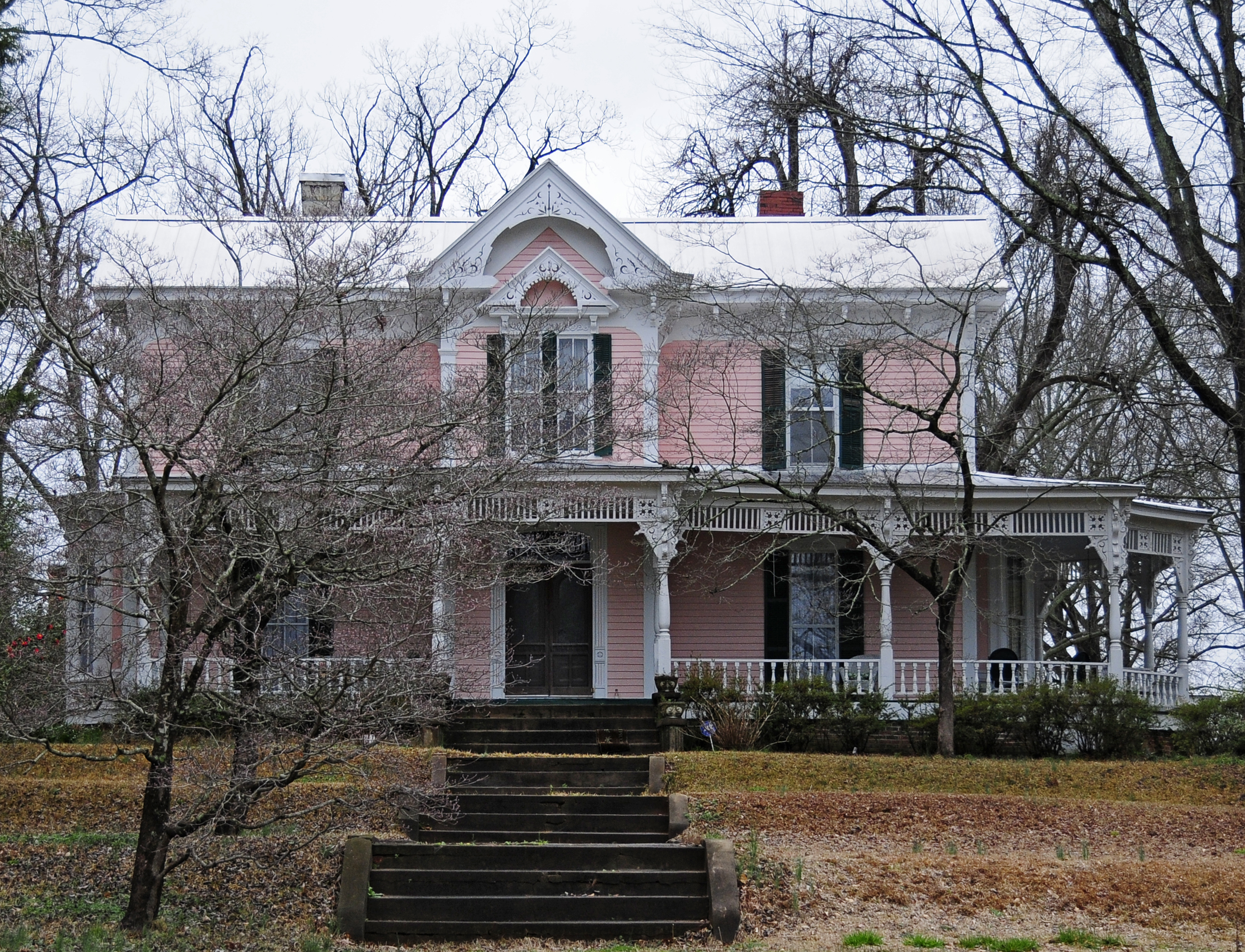
- House in the South Harper Historic District, February 2012

- Location within South Carolina Location within the United States
- Location: Both sides of S. Harper St. from 320 to 1037, Laurens, South Carolina
- Coordinates: 34°29′31″N 82°00′59″W
- Area: 32 acres (13 ha)
- Architectural style: Classical Revival, Queen Anne, Early 20th century cottages
- MPS: City of Laurens MRA
- NRHP reference No.: 86003161
- Added to NRHP: November 19, 1986

South Harper Historic District is a national historic district located at Laurens, Laurens County, South Carolina. It encompasses 44 contributing buildings in a residential section of Laurens. It includes a collection of early-20th century vernacular residences and houses that range in date from the early-19th century to about 1935, with almost half having been built during the first decade of the 20th century. Architectural styles include Neo-Classical, Queen Anne, Colonial Revival, and Bungalow. Notable dwellings include the Hix-Blackwell House (c. 1857), H. Douglas Gray House (c. 1910), Machen-Long House (c. 1905), and Gov. Robert Archer Cooper House (c. 1905).

The South Harper Historic District was added to the National Register of Historic Places in 1986.
