= Alvan F. Sanborn =

Alvan Francis Sanborn
- Born: July 8, 1866; Marlborough, Massachusetts, U.S.
- Died: 1966 (aged 99–100)
- Education: Amherst College
- Occupations: Author; Journalist
- Spouse: Marie Perrin
- Parent(s): Alvin P. and Sarah B. (Weeks) Sanborn

Alvan Francis Sanborn (July 8, 1866–1966) was an American journalist and author. He was known as a French conservative. While living abroad, he focused much of his writing on certain phases of French life.

Sanborn spent more than 35 years writing for a number of news, publishing companies and periodicals including, The Atlantic Monthly, the New York Times, the Boston Traveller and the Boston Transcript. Sanborn authored and edited numerous books and articles during the course of his career.

He enlisted, at age 49, in the French Foreign Legion and served as an interpreter with the American Expeditionary Forces during World War I. Sanborn was also a member of the Inter-Allied Commission for the reeducation of war cripples, representing the Department of Interior.

== Biography ==
=== Background and education ===
Alvan Francis Sanborn was born in Marlboro, Massachusetts. His father, Alvin P. Sanborn, (b. August 26, 1824, in Dexter, ME) was a shoemaker, his mother, Sarah Brown (Weeks) Sanborn, was a native of Marlboro (b. January 16, 1830).

Sanborn attended Marlboro High School before enrolling at Amherst College. He graduated from Amherst, Phi Beta Kappa, with his bachelor's degree in 1887, and attended the School of Political Science at Columbia University, New York, for one year.

On October 5, 1905, Sanborn married Marie Perrin, in Paris, France.

=== Career timeline ===
1888–1890 Assistant editor, D. Lothrop & Company, a Boston publishing house.

1890–1891 Associate editor of the International Cyclopaedia, Dodd, Mead & Company.

1891–1892 Editor-in-chief, The Cottage Hearth magazine, published by W.A.Wilde & Company, Boston. The magazine covered home arts and culture.

From 1892–1896, Sanborn spent four years as a resident worker at the South End House, (formerly the Andover House settlement) Boston University settlement, living and working among the poor. Sanborn, in an article for The Atlantic Monthly, titled, "The Future of Rural New England," wrote of the "deplorable eating habits of rural New Englanders," and the addition of "up-to-date gewgaws," and sets of furniture, that one would find in the city, rather than the farmhouses, in the rural setting that was the settlement. Sanborn wrote the story during a time when tourism was being promoted as an economic opportunity for the area. Later, in 1900, he was quoted in a bulletin by the Foundation University de Belleville, concerning settlements in France.

1899–1902, Paris correspondent, for the Boston Evening Transcript.

During 1900, 1904, and 1905, he wrote as a Paris correspondent for the Atlantic Monthly magazine.

1905, Sanborn was part of the editorial staff, and worked as a New York special correspondent for the Boston Traveller.

1906–1907, Sanborn served as associate editor, Grafton Press, New York City.

Sanborn continued writing as a regular Paris correspondent for the New York Times Saturday Review of Books and as special correspondent for the Boston Transcript; he contributed to other reviews and magazines, mostly on French life and culture.

He was a member of the Paris Foreign Press Syndicate.

=== Military service: 1914–1923 ===
In 1914, Sanborn, at age 49, enlisted in the French Foreign Legion, in the early days of World War I. He served with the Third Marching Regiment, de Marche du 1st Etranger. Sanborn was well past the usual age for military service, but he insisted on joining; he was sent to Reuilly Barracks, to await the arrival of other American volunteers, who arrived over a period of several weeks. After being deployed, the regiment suffered heavy casualties and injuries; Sanborn nearly died from pneumonia, after standing in rain that came up to his knees, on a night of freezing temperatures as he stood on outpost duty. He was "invalided," out of service and discharged after recovering in the hospital, having only served for one year.

Later, Sanborn volunteered as an interpreter, for the American Expeditionary Forces, when the first United States troops arrived in France. In 1917, he was named as a member of the Inter-Allied Commission for the professional re-education of war cripples, representing the Department of Interior, serving in the position until 1923. After resigning the position, he purchased a home in Paris, and returned to his journalism career, as a writer and newspaper correspondent.

== Selected works ==
=== Books ===
- The anatomy of a tenement street, Andover House, 1894.
- Moody's lodging house: and other tenement sketches, Copeland and Day, 1895.
- A study of beggars and their lodgings, Forum Publishing Company, 1895.
- Meg McIntyre's raffle, and other stories, Copeland and Day, 1896.
- Paris and the social revolution: a study of the revolutionary elements in the various classes of parisian society, co-authored with Vaughn Trowbridge, Marion L. Peabody, etal., Small, Maynard & Company, 1905.
- Henry Vignaud, American: the well-beloved secretary of our Paris embassy, publisher unknown, May 8, 1909.
- The present situation in France: a series of ten letters on the results of the campaign against religion, Supervisor of Parish Schools, 1909.
- Bergson: creator of a new philosophy, publisher not identified, 1913.

=== Articles ===
- Paris Workingmen's Cafés, The North American Review, v.158, no.447, 1894.
- The Reading of Poor Children, The North American Review, v.159, no.454, 1894.
- Book Review: The Quest, The North American Review, v.185, no.614, 1907.
- Book Review: Ralph Waldo Emerson: Sa Vie et Son Œuvre, The North American Review, v.188, no.636, (date not identified).
- Little Flower of Lisieux, The North American Review, v. 227, no.4, 1929.
