= Francis G. Sanborn =

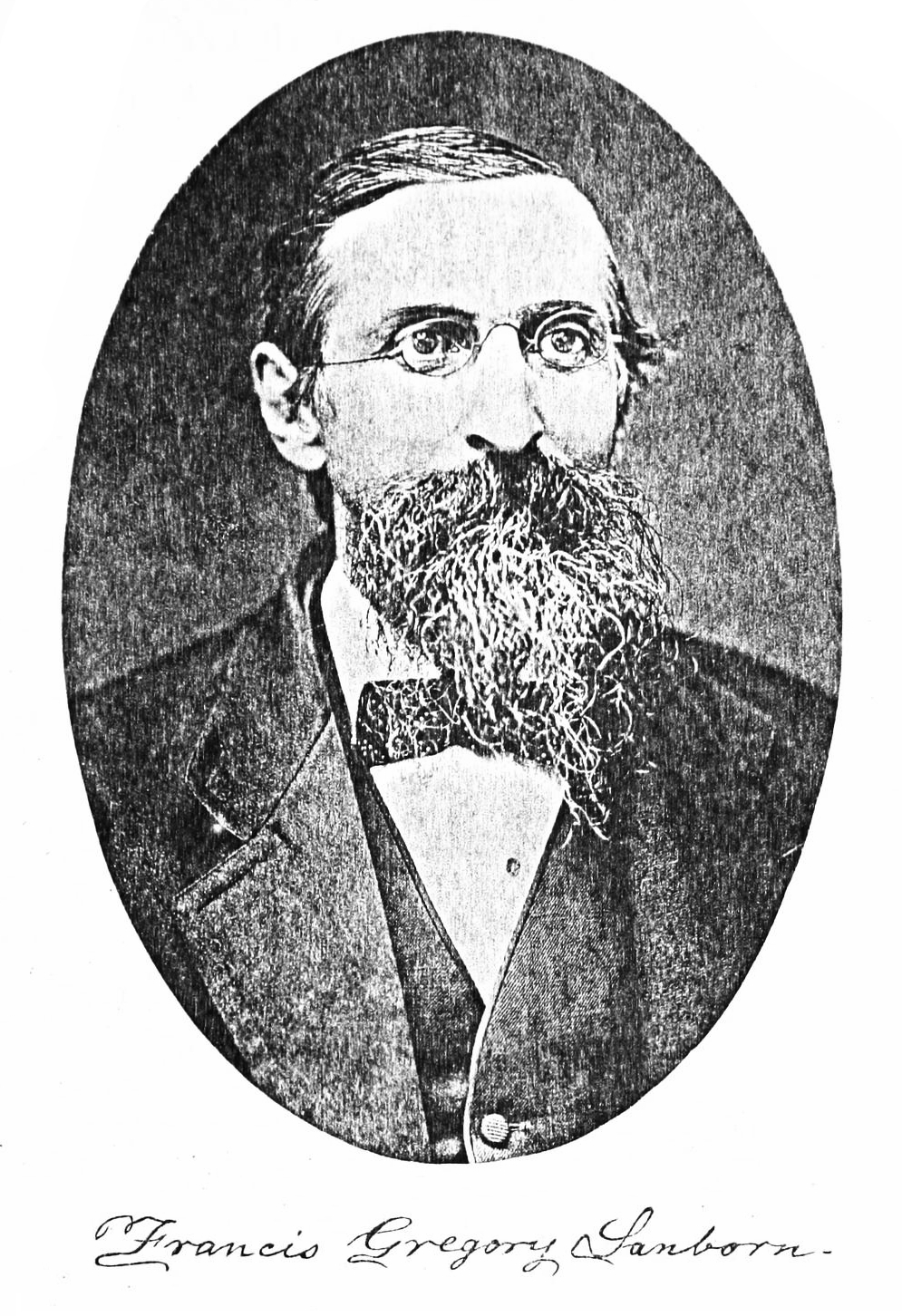

Francis Gregory Sanborn (18 January 1838 – 5 June 1884) was an American naturalist and entomologist. He worked on agricultural entomology with C. L. Flint in the state cabinet at the state house in Boston, Massachusetts.

== Life and work ==
Sanborn was born in Andover to Mary Call Lawrence Gregory (1808–1883) and physician Eastman Sanborn (1800–1859) of Sanbornton. His father had studied medicine at Harvard College and specialized in dentistry, being an early user of ether and anaesthetics in his practice. His father had also been involved in establishing the Andover Horticultural Society. The younger Sanborn took an interest in insects at a very early age, keeping notes from 1846. He studied French from a private tutor and went to the Phillips Academy from 1849 to 1854 under Samuel Harvey Taylor. In 1856 he went to Punchard High School and returned to Phillips Academy in 1857. By this time he had collected a thousand insect specimens and wrote a report to the Massachusetts Agricultural Society after being encouraged by C. L. Flint. In 1858 he went to Boston and worked under Flint as an assistant with the aim of producing a new edition of the Insects injurious to vegetation written by Thaddeus W. Harris. In 1862, he wrote "Insects of Massachusetts Beneficial to Agriculture." He worked with the Boston Society of Natural History in 1865 and worked there are as an assistant until 1872. He labelled the bird collections of Lafresnaye and Bryant in this period. He became an entomology instructor at the Bussey Institution, Harvard University, in 1872. In 1874 he worked with the Geological Survey of Kentucky with Professor Nathaniel Shaler, visiting several caves. In 1875 he examined the mollusc collections of John Milton Earle. In 1875 he worked on the beetle collections at the Smithsonian Institution. He gave talks at various schools and associations, especially on insects. He was an antiquarian and was a member of the Worcester Society of Antiquity. From 1859 he had been a member of the American Association for the Advancement of Science. Sanborn was a follower of natural theology and considered entomological study to be "the study of the works of the Creator". He was appointed a justice of the peace in West Roxbury in 1872 He died at Providence in the home of a friend from an overdose of chloral that he took for a nervous affliction.
