= Aroline Sanborn =

American diarist

Aroline Sanborn (August 13, 1825 - July 10, 1900) was a nineteenth-century American diarist who lived in Kingston, New Hampshire. She was the wife of Dr. Samuel Bartlett (1811-1865), the great-grandson of Josiah Bartlett, one of the original signers of the Declaration of Independence. Her diary is considered an excellent primary source for students interested in learning more about what domestic life for American women was like in the mid-nineteenth century.
