= Deseret Museum =

Museum in Salt Lake City, Utah

Coordinates: 40.7692°N 111.8929°W

The Deseret Museum was a museum in Salt Lake City, Utah.

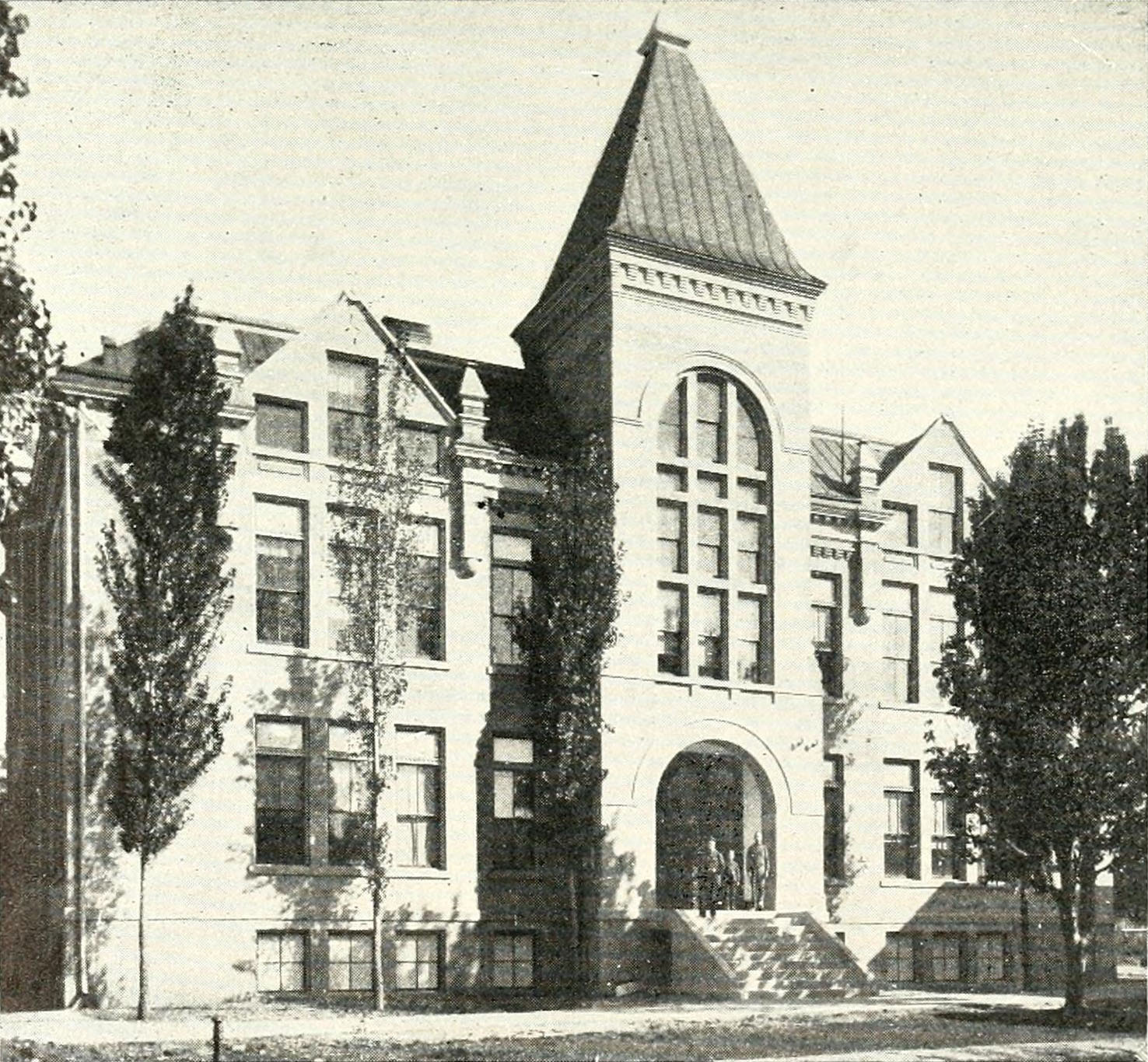
The Church University building, which housed the museum from 1893 to 1903

It was originally opened as the "Salt Lake City Museum and Menagerie" by John Willard Young, with Guglielmo Giosue Rosetti Sangiovanni as curator, in 1869.

Ownership was transferred to the Church of Jesus Christ of Latter-day Saints in 1878 and Joseph L. Barfoot became curator until his death in 1882. In 1885, the Salt Lake Literary and Scientific Association acquired the property and renamed it the "Deseret Museum". In 1891 James E. Talmage became curator and was assisted by J. Reuben Clark Jr. until 1903. When Talmage was called to the Quorum of the Twelve in 1911 his son, Sterling B. Talmage, became curator.

In 1919, the museum was taken over by the Temple Square Bureau of Information and ceased its existence as a separate institution. The collections not displayed at Temple Square were dispersed among institutions around the world, including the LDS University museum and the Daughters of Utah Pioneers museum.

== Sources ==
- Jenson, Andrew. Encyclopedic History of the Church of Jesus Christ of Latter-day Saints. (Salt Lake City, Utah: Deseret News Press, 1941) p. 186
- Eubanks, Lila Carpenter. "The Deseret Museum". Utah Historical Quarterly 50, no. 4 (Fall 1982): 361–76.
- Jacobsen, Florence Smith (1992), "Museums, LDS", in Ludlow, Daniel H. (ed.), Encyclopedia of Mormonism, New York: Macmillan Publishing, pp. 971–73, ISBN 0-02-879602-0, OCLC 24502140
- Talmage, James E. "The Deseret Museum". Improvement Era. September 1911. Pages 952+.
