= Willard Young =

American military person (1852–1936)

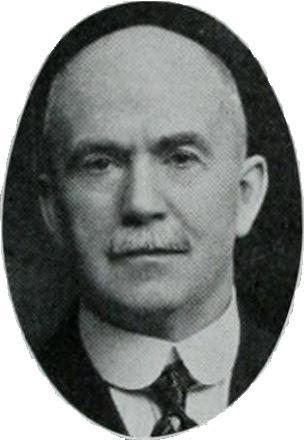
- ca. 1923

President of Young University
- 1891 – 1893

President of LDS Business College
- 1906 – 1915

Military career
- 1875 – 1891, 1898 – 1899 (Army); 1896 – 1898 (National Guard)
- Allegiance: United States of America
- Service/branch: United States Army
- Rank: Colonel (USA); Brigadier General (Utah)
- Unit: United States Army Corps of Engineers; Utah National Guard
- Commands held: 2nd US Volunteer Engineer Regiment
- Battles/wars: Spanish–American War

Personal details
- Born: 30 April 1852; Salt Lake City, Utah Territory
- Died: 25 July 1936 (aged 84); Salt Lake City, Utah
- Resting place: Salt Lake City Cemetery; 40.7772°N 111.858°W
- Spouse(s): Harriet Hooper (m. 1882)
- Children: 3
- Parents: Brigham Young; Clarissa Ross Young

Willard Young (April 30, 1852 – July 25, 1936) was a prominent member of the Church of Jesus Christ of Latter-day Saints (LDS Church) who served for many years in the United States military, and later held high positions within the LDS Church's administration. He also served as an educational leader.

Born in Salt Lake City, Utah Territory, Young was the son of Brigham Young and Clarissa Ross Young. His mother died when he was six, and after this Zina D. H. Young acted as his mother. Young is at times described as Zina's "foster son".

In 1860, Young was baptized a member of the LDS Church by James Works.

In 1871, Young began as a cadet at West Point. He graduated from West Point in 1875 and was appointed a second lieutenant with the United States Army Corps of Engineers. From 1875 to 1877 he was stationed at Willets Point, New York. From 1877 to 1879 he worked under Lieutenant Wheeler in the geographical survey of the United States west of the 100th meridian.

From 1879 to 1883 Young was an instructor and then a professor at West Point.

Young married Harriet Hooper on August 1, 1882. She was the daughter of Willam H. Hooper. Young was ordained a seventy in 1891 and served as a Mutual Improvement Association Missionary in Davis, Weber and Box Elder counties in northern Utah. While working for the Corps of Engineers, Young was involved in making detailed maps of northern Utah and southern Idaho.

Young was the local supervisor in the construction of the Cascade Locks in Oregon. In 1886 Young was advanced to the rank of captain. From October 1889 to June 1890 Young was stationed in Memphis, Tennessee, supervising the Third District of the Mississippi River.

In 1891, Young resigned from the Army. From 1891 until 1893 Young served as president of the nascent Salt Lake City-based Young University. That institution ceased operation in 1894, and from there Young moved to serve as city engineer for Salt Lake City (1893-95). He then was appointed Utah's first state engineer, a position he held until the start of the Spanish–American War.

In 1896 Young was appointed brigadier-general of the Utah National Guard. He was still serving in this position when the Spanish–American War began. He was a key figure in organizing the Utah volunteers. He then was appointed a colonel in the Second Regiment, U.S. Volunteer Engineers. He eventually went to Hawaii and served in the army until May 16, 1899.

From 1906 until 1915 Young was the president of the LDS Business College. In this position he had responsibility for general supervision of the Deseret Gym.

From 1907 Young served as an alternate member of the Ensign Stake High Council.

From January 1916 until July 1917 Young served as an assistant to the president of the Logan Utah Temple. With the outbreak of World War I, Young again joined the army. During the war he was in charge of the Kansas City Engineer District.

In 1919 Young was made superintendent of the LDS Church's building activities. From 1923, this department supervised the building of meetinghouses and seminary buildings, providing the architectural plans for the buildings.

== Young University ==
In 1876, LDS Church President Brigham Young executed a deed of land for the establishment of an academy (initially to be known as 'Brigham Young Academy') in Salt Lake City (as he also did for Provo [1875] and Logan [1877]); Willard Young was one of the seven trustees named to oversee its subsequent development. However, later problems with the board of trustees designated for this academy, as well as growing friction between the Church and the federal government, delayed its establishment.

No results of consequence had been obtained by August 1883, when Willard Young returned to Salt Lake City after his teaching appointments at West Point. He immediately began talking to the other trustees, and sought to obtain financial backing from the LDS Church. However, he received orders in October of 1883 to report to Portland, Oregon, and the matter was again dropped.

During his absence, the LDS Church backed the establishment of the 'Salt Lake Stake Academy', which was created in 1886. This push, instituted by President Wilford Woodruff, was an effort to increase educational opportunities in the area: in 1888, the church established and put into operation 18 academies, operated through the church's "stakes" or ecclesiastical groups. As part of this push, in June 1888 the General Church Board of Education examined the deed of trust for the Brigham Young Academy at Salt Lake City. Following the meeting, Wilford Woodruff wrote a letter to Willard Young asking his aid in using the deeded property for the Salt Lake Stake Academy. No response from Young is recorded, and the Young Academy's deed remained unchanged. By 1 May 1890 it appears that Woodruff had decided against creating a church-based educational institution in Salt Lake City, because he and his counselors wrote to Young, asking him to resign his military commission and assume the presidency of a new, independent university, to be named Young Academy. This organization was renamed 'University of the Church of Jesus Christ of Latter-day Saints' in 1892, and was locally referred to as 'the Church University'. It apparently was intended to become 'the' Mormon institution of higher learning, and a high class university, second to none in the west.

Young was in Salt Lake City by 30 November 1890. He vigorously promoted, arranged, planned, persuaded, and by September 1893 the institution began presenting lectures at 233 West 200 North. However, the effort lasted only through that school year; in spring 1894 its final classes were presented.
