= Daniel Alfred Sanborn =

American surveyor (1827–1883)

Daniel Alfred Sanborn (April 5, 1827 in Somerville, Massachusetts – April 11, 1883 in Brooklyn, New York) was a surveyor who founded the Sanborn Map Company, a well-known provider of fire insurance maps.

Before starting his company he produced insurance maps for Boston and several cities in Tennessee for the Aetna Insurance Company. He was originally hired by Aetna because they were impressed by his work on a Boston Atlas. In 1867 he formed the D.A. Sanborn National Insurance Diagram Bureau in New York City.

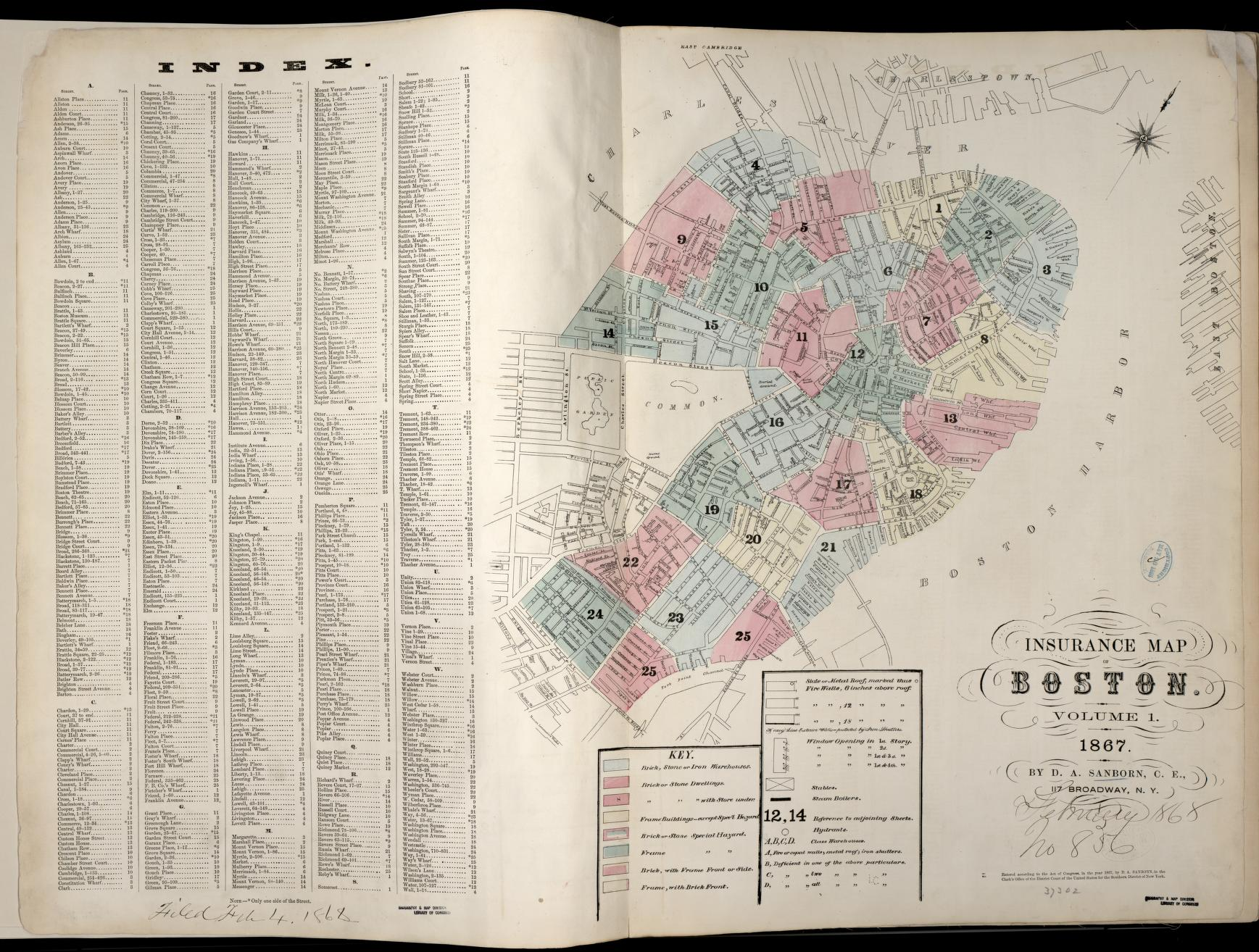
The earliest published Sanborn insurance map: a map showing Boston with a key that indicates characteristics essential for insurance, e.g., type of material used in construction, roof, etc.

== See also ==
- Sanborn maps
