= Edwin David Sanborn =

American politician

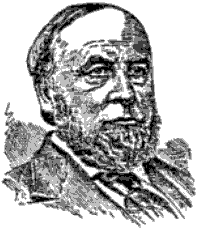
- Born: May 14, 1808; Gilmanton, New Hampshire
- Died: December 29, 1885 (aged 77); New York, New York
- Education: Dartmouth College; Andover Theological Seminary; University of Vermont
- Occupation: Educator
- Spouse: Mary Ann Webster (m. 1837)

Edwin David Sanborn (May 14, 1808 – December 29, 1885) was an American educator.

== Biography ==
Edwin David Sanborn was born in Gilmanton, New Hampshire on May 14, 1808.

He died in New York on December 29, 1885.
