= Sanborn maps =

Detailed maps of cities and towns in the United States

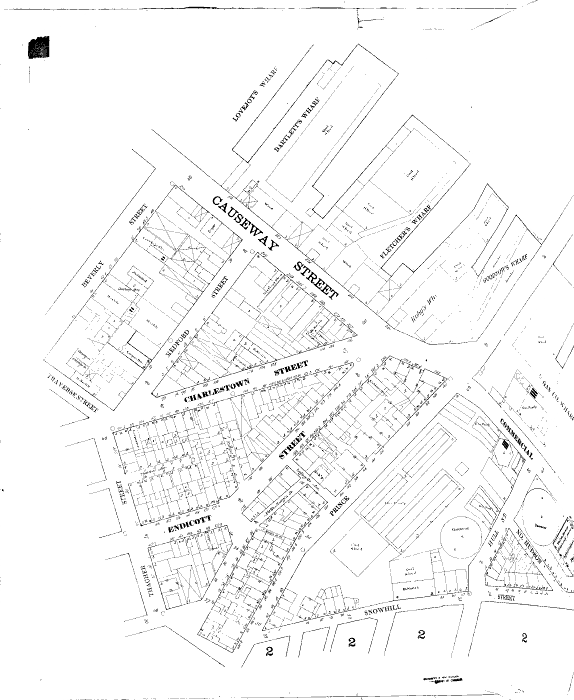
- Sanborn map of Boston from 1867
- Type: City map
- Inventor: Daniel Alfred Sanborn
- Inception: 1866
- Manufacturer: The Sanborn Map Company
- Available: Available
- Current supplier: LightBox
- Website: https://edrnet.com/prods/sanborn-maps/

Sanborn maps are detailed maps of U.S. cities and towns in the 19th and 20th centuries. Originally published by the Sanborn Map Company (Sanborn), they were created to allow fire insurance companies to assess their total liability in urbanized areas of the United States. Since they contain detailed information about properties and individual buildings in approximately 12,000 American cities and towns, Sanborn maps are valuable for documenting changes in the built environment over many decades.

Sanborn held a monopoly over fire insurance maps for the majority of the 20th century, but the business declined as US insurance companies stopped using maps for underwriting in the 1960s. The last Sanborn fire maps were published on microfilm in 1977, but old Sanborn maps remain useful for historical research into urban geography. The license for the maps was acquired by land data company Environmental Data Resources (EDR), and EDR was acquired in 2019 by real estate services company LightBox.

== Description ==
The Sanborn maps themselves are large-scale lithographed street plans at a scale of 50 feet to one inch (1:600) on 21 by 25 inches (53 by 64 cm) sheets of paper. The maps were published in volumes, bound and then updated until the subsequent volume was produced. Larger cities would be covered by multiple volumes of maps. Between editions of published volumes, map updates were sent out as correction slips. Sanborn employees, called "pasters" or "correctors", would visit subscribers' offices to paste the slips on top of the old maps.

The map volumes contain an enormous amount of information. They are organized as follows: a decorative title page; an index of streets and addresses; a "specials" index with the names of churches, schools, businesses etc.; and a master index indicating the entirety of the mapped area and the sheet numbers for each large-scale map (usually depicting four to six blocks); and general information such as population, economy and prevailing wind direction.

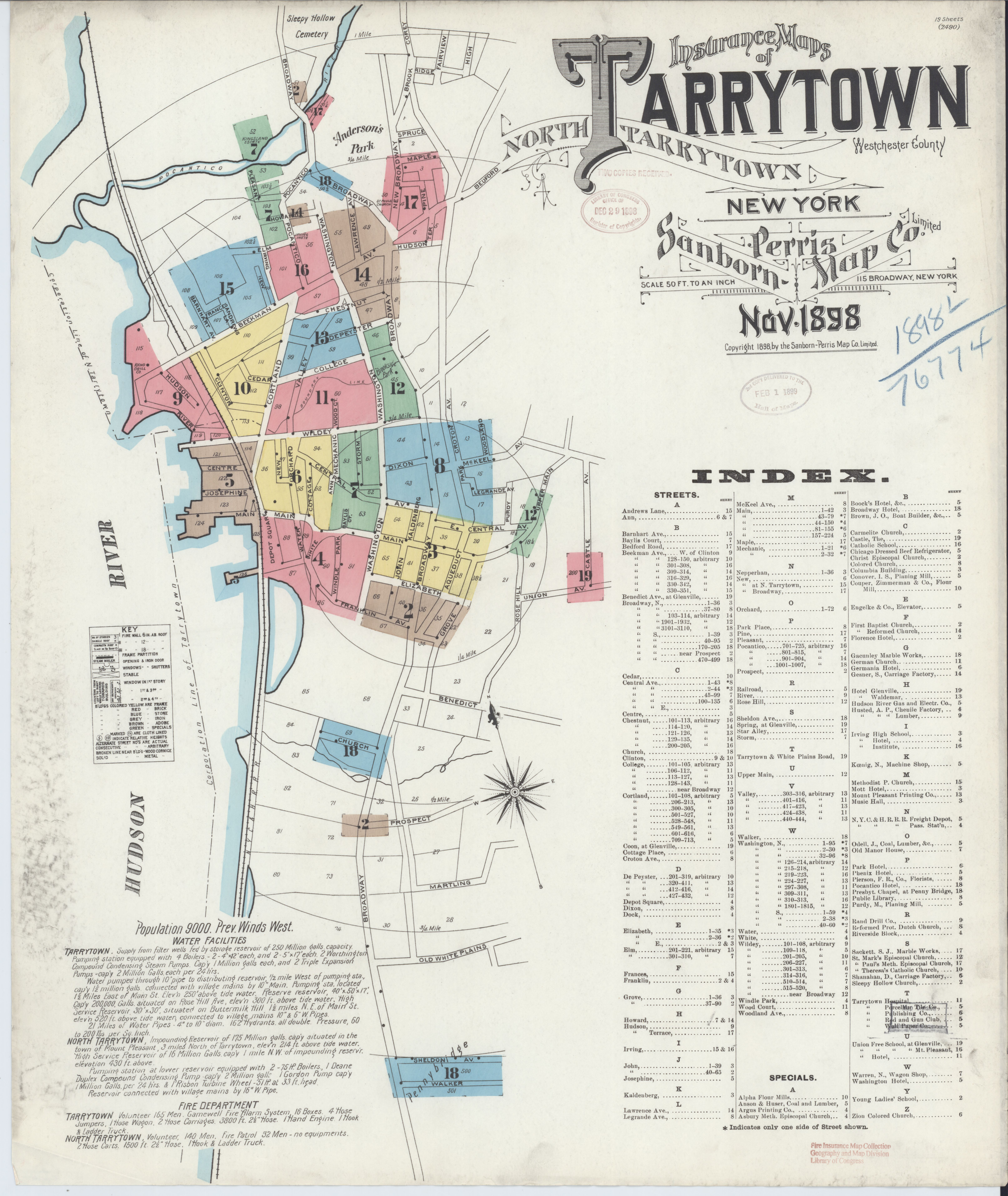
The 1898 Sanborn map of Tarrytown and North Tarrytown describes, in detail, the strength of fire departments in each of the two villages

The maps include outlines of each building and outbuilding; the location of windows and doors; street names; street and sidewalk widths; property boundaries; fire walls; natural features (rivers, canals, etc.); railroad corridors; building use (sometimes even particular room uses); house and block number; as well as the composition of building materials including the framing, flooring, and roofing materials; the strength of the local fire department; indications of sprinkler systems; locations of fire hydrants; location of water and gas mains; and even the names of most public buildings, churches and businesses.

Unique information includes the location of the homes of prominent individuals, brothels, and more ephemeral buildings including outhouses and stables.

== Insurance underwriting ==
At the outset of the fire insurance industry, underwriters visited every property that was under consideration for coverage. As insurance companies increased their service areas, it was no longer practical to send people to every insurable property to assess the risk. The Sanborn maps allowed them to underwrite properties from the office, pooling the cost with other insurance companies that also subscribed to the maps. It was said that at one time, insurance companies and their agents "relied upon them with almost blind faith".

The maps were used by insurance companies to determine the potential risk of a particular building, taking into account all of the information included on the map: building material, proximity to other buildings and fire departments, the location of gas lines, etc. The decision as to how much, if any, insurance would be offered to a customer was often determined solely through the use of a Sanborn map. The maps also allowed insurance companies to visualize their exposure in their coverage areas; when an agent sold a policy, he could color in the corresponding building on the map.

== History ==
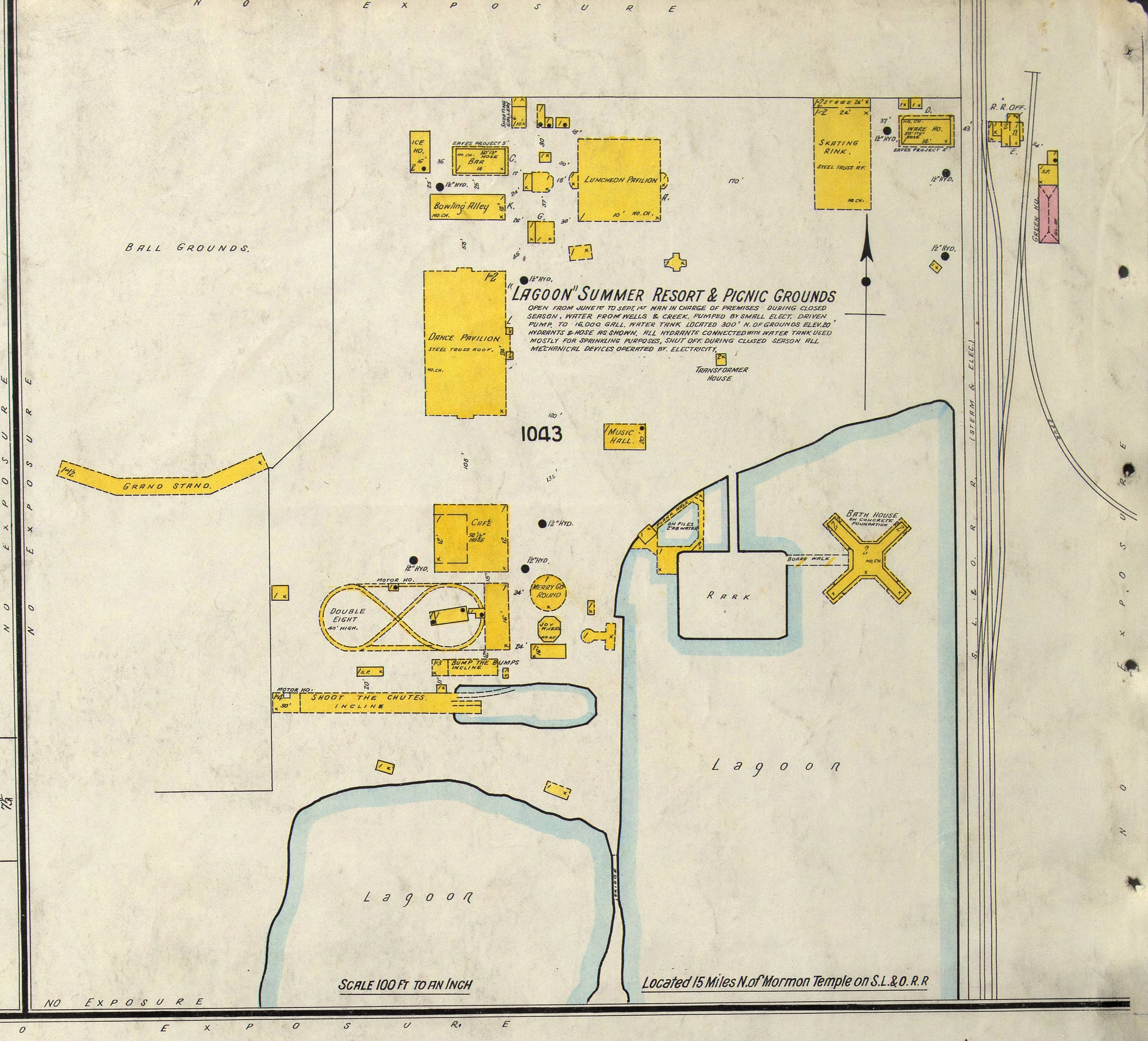
1911 Sanborn map showing Lagoon Amusement Park in Farmington, Utah

In the late 18th century, insurance companies in London began to create detailed maps to give underwriters the information they needed to assess fire risk. The practice was adopted by American insurance companies in the mid-19th century. Demand for fire insurance mapping grew rapidly after the end of the Civil War. Factors such as the Homestead Act, railroad construction, the Second Industrial Revolution and massive immigration to the United States all fostered huge population growths, urbanization, and heightened demand for mapping.

Daniel Alfred Sanborn, a civil engineer and surveyor, began working on fire insurance maps in 1866. That year, he was contracted by the Aetna Insurance Company to prepare maps of areas in Tennessee. About the same time, he developed similar maps of Boston, published as Insurance Map of Boston, Volume 1, 1867. Seeing a lucrative market for this type of map, he established the D. A. Sanborn National Insurance Diagram Bureau in New York City to publish the Boston atlas and develop and sell maps of additional areas.

Within several decades, the company became the largest and most successful American map company. This growth came about through savvy management and the buyout of competing firms. In 1889 Sanborn acquired Perris and Browne, an older firm, and can by virtue of this expansion date its origins to 1852. The firm name established by Sanborn in 1867 was changed in 1876 when the firm was incorporated under the name Sanborn Map and Publishing Company, which then became the Sanborn-Perris Map Company, Ltd. until 1902, when the name was shortened to the Sanborn Map Company.

In 1916, Sanborn purchased its last major competitor, the E. Hexamer & Sons of Philadelphia, and became a monopoly. Company headquarters moved to 629 Fifth Avenue in northern Pelham, New York, but there were also regional offices in San Francisco, Chicago, and Atlanta. The Sanborn Company sent out legions of surveyors to map building footprints in all major urbanized areas, along with building details related to fire risk. At its peak in the 1920s, the company employed about 700 people, including about 300 field surveyors and 400 cartographers, printers, managers, salesmen, and support staff. Areas under intensive development were surveyed every six months.

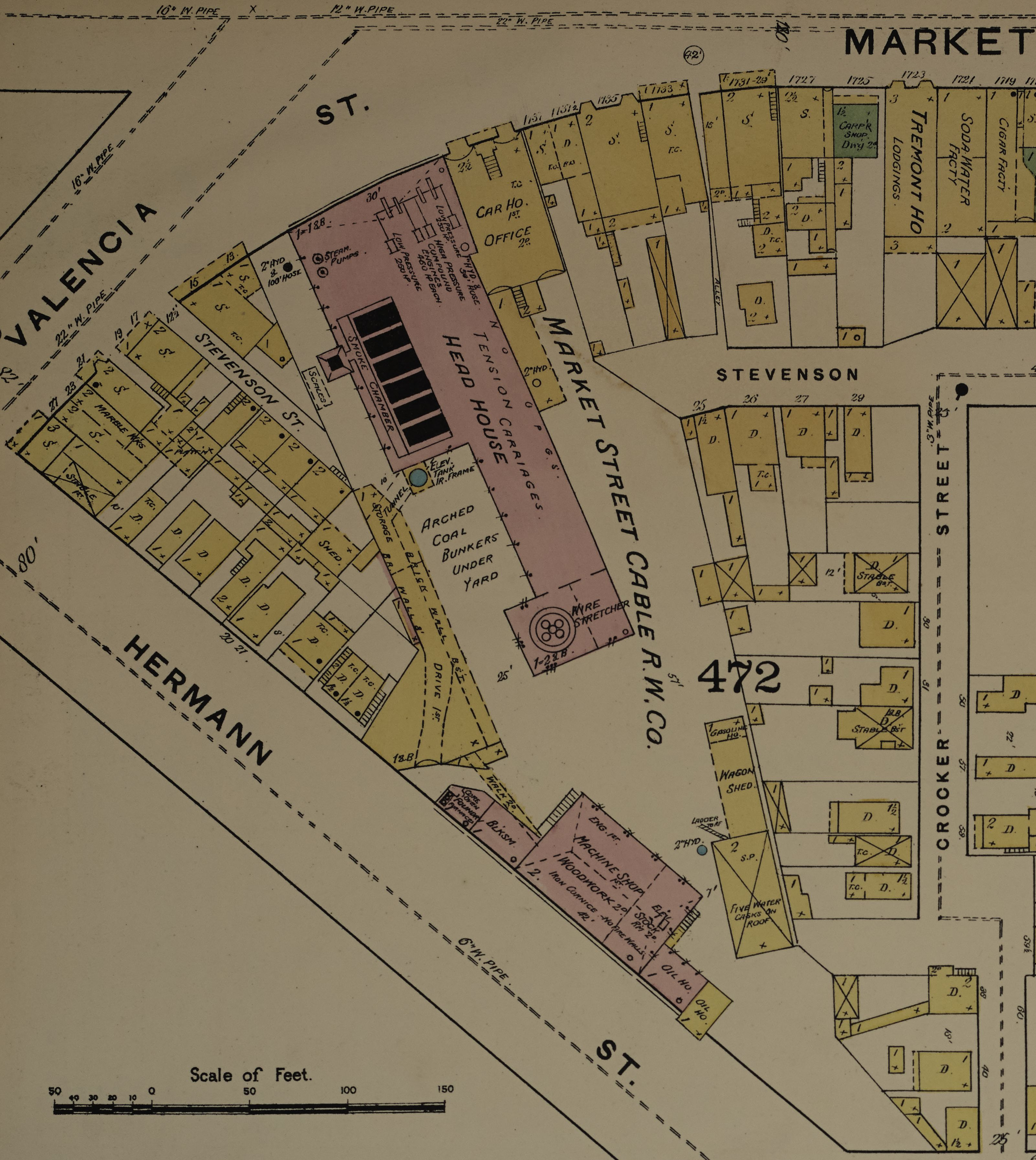
"MARKET STREET CABLE R. W. CO." in 1889 map detail from Sanborn Fire Insurance Map of San Francisco, California

Sanborn's monopoly was resented by some insurance companies for its high cost. The Underwriter's Association of the Pacific complained that an "Eastern monopoly" was giving service that was "very slow, expensive, and generally unsatisfactory." In the 1910s, the National Board of Fire Underwriters investigated the possibility of creating its own maps. However, many insurance companies opposed the proposal, citing the "very large expenditure" required and their satisfaction with Sanborn's "commendably satisfactory" service. Instead, the NBFU Map Committee took an active role in Sanborn's operations. In 1922, Sanborn agreed to add a member of the Map Committee to its board of directors, and a second seat was added by 1927. However, the onset of the Great Depression greatly curtailed construction activity in the United States. By 1936, Sanborn had reduced its publishing output from 60 to 20 volumes per year, a pace that would take over 50 years to update the entire map collection.

=== Decline of insurance business ===
In the 1950s, insurance companies began to use an alternative form of underwriting known as line carding. Line carding had been used for decades to underwrite properties that were not covered by fire maps. Each insured property was listed on a single card, and no map was kept. Corporate mergers also reduced the need for Sanborn Maps, since the consolidated company only needed to buy one set of maps. As insurance companies increased in size, they could withstand larger disasters and no longer needed to use insurance maps to reduce their concentration of risk. Companies also cited "modern building construction, better building fire codes, and improved fire protection methods for the decline in importance of fire insurance maps."

From the late 1930s to the late 1950s, Sanborn's annual profit fell from $500,000 to just $100,000. About thirty insurance companies accounted for most of the company's sales. However, its monopoly over insurance mapping had allowed it to earn substantial profits over the decades. These profits were invested in a portfolio of stocks and bonds. By 1958, the stock was selling for $45 per share, but the investment portfolio was worth $65 per share. This attracted the attention of the young Warren Buffett, who pressured the company to distribute the investment portfolio to shareholders.

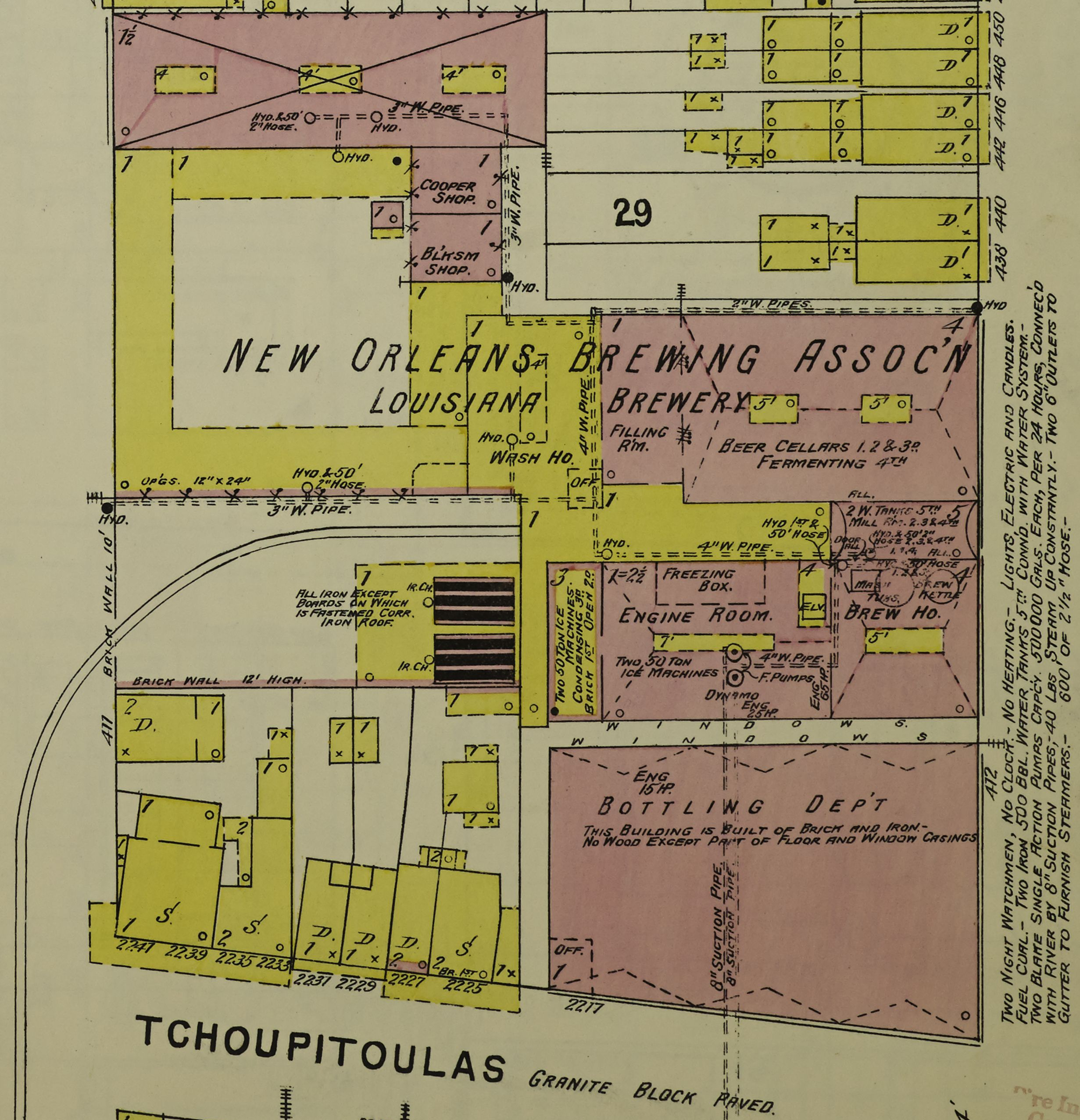
"New Orleans Brewing Association" Brewery in 1896 from Sanborn Fire Insurance Map of New Orleans

Buffett eventually purchased 23% of the company's outstanding shares as an activist investor, representing 35% of his investment partnership's total assets under management. Allied with other dissatisfied shareholders, Buffett could count on the votes of at least 44% of the shares in a proxy fight. The board agreed to buy back shares from any shareholder at fair value, paying with a portion of its investment portfolio. 72% of the outstanding shares were turned in. In just two years, Buffett had secured a 50% return on his investment.

With the decline of its insurance business, Sanborn could no longer afford to maintain its army of surveyors. However, the company continued to sell its maps and perform some updates. Government sales began to play a larger role, especially the Census Bureau and municipal planning agencies. Sanborn printed its last catalog in 1950, created its last new map in 1961, and issued its last update in 1977.

In 1996, the license for the maps was acquired by land data company Environmental Data Resources (EDR). In 2019, EDR was acquired by real estate services company LightBox.

Over time, Sanborn diversified into other mapping activities, and as of 2020 is a geospatial specialist and holder of electronic GIS assets and systems, though the fire insurance business continues as a niche department. Corporate headquarters are in Colorado.

== Modern uses of fire insurance maps ==
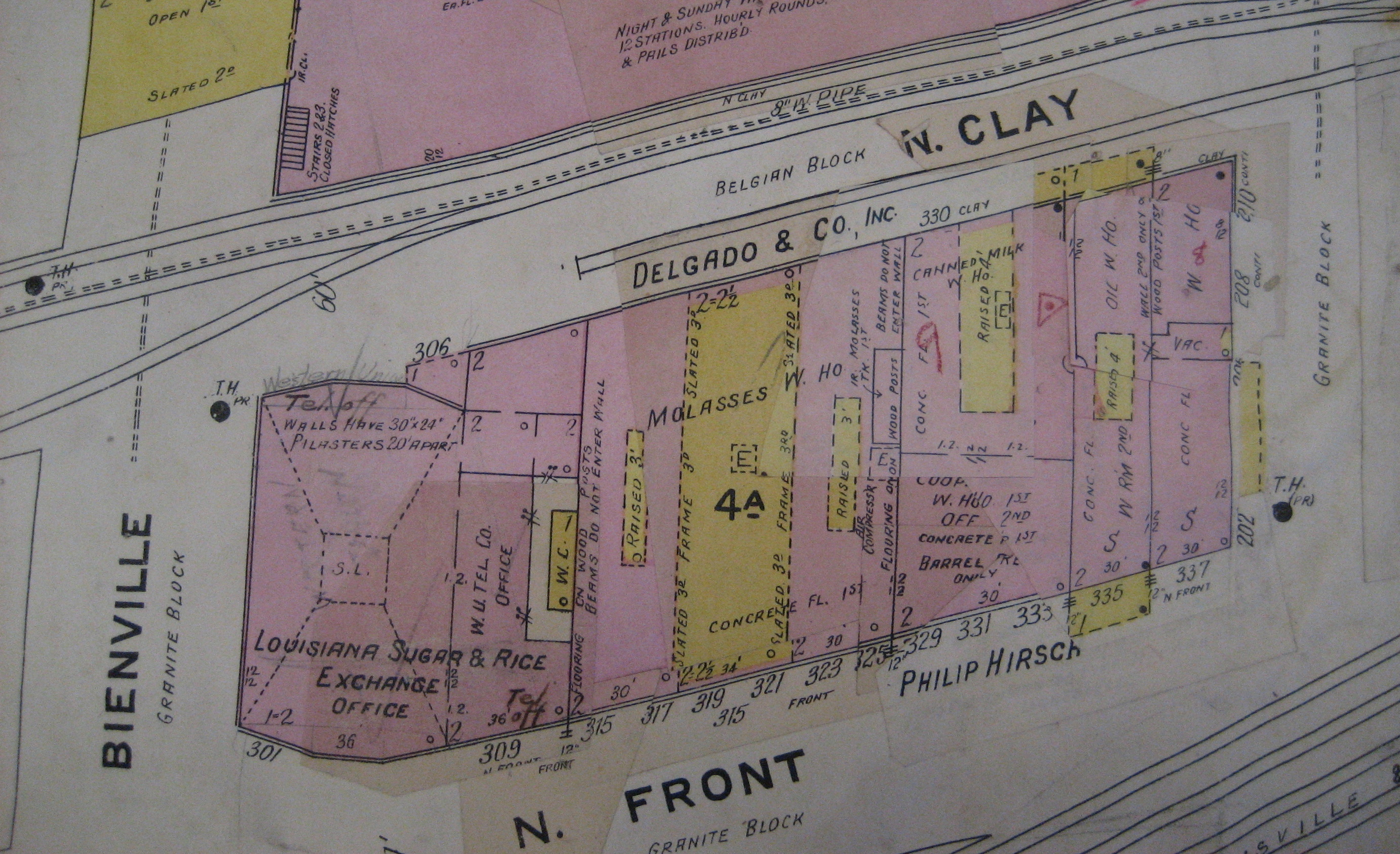
Early 20th-century Sanborn map showing a (since demolished) block of New Orleans

Sanborn maps are found primarily in the archives and special collections of town halls and public and university libraries, and remain a resource for people in many different fields. The maps facilitate historical research through the study of urban growth and decline patterns, and for research into the evolution of specific buildings, sites and districts. Genealogists use the maps to locate the residences and workplaces of ancestors. Planners use the maps to study historic urban planning designs. Historic preservationists use the maps to understand the significance and historical evolution of buildings, including their historic uses and building materials in conservation and rehabilitation efforts. Demographers and urban geographers use them to study patterns of growth and migration of populations. Environmental scientists also use the maps for historical analysis of properties, as the maps often showed the locations of gas stations, drycleaners, and other potential sources of soil and groundwater contamination.

Historic Sanborn maps are available through public or university libraries, including the Library of Congress, and from the copyright owners, Environmental Data Resources (EDR), a division of LightBox.

== See also ==
- Walter Ristow
