= Edward Tullidge =

American historian

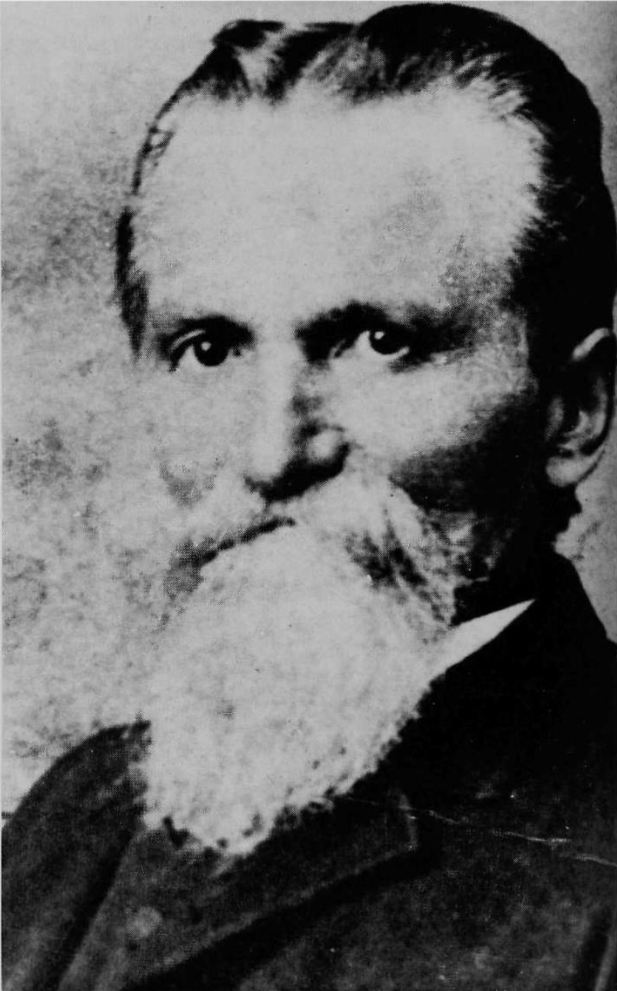
Portrait of Edward Tullidge

Edward Wheelock Tullidge (September 30, 1829 – May 21, 1894) was a literary critic, newspaper editor, playwright, and historian of the Utah Territory, US. He was a member and leader in several different denominations of the Latter Day Saint Movement, including the Church of Jesus Christ of Latter-day Saints (LDS Church), the New (Godbeite) Movement movement, and the Reorganized Church of Jesus Christ of Latter Day Saints (RLDS Church). He played a significant role in the creation of the Salt Lake Tribune newspaper.

Towards his death, Tullidge was respected even within the LDS Church community for his fair portrayals in his histories. He was a strong advocate for women's suffrage. Historian Claudia Bushman wrote that Tullidge "stood alone as a Mormon feminist historian before the revitalization of the women's movement in the 1970s."

== Biography ==
=== Early life in England ===
Tullidge was born at Weymouth, Dorset, England as Edward William Tullidge. He was born into a middle class Methodist home, and apprenticed as a coach builder and painter. His father was John E. Tullidge, who became a noted early musician in the state of Utah.

At the age of 17 he became a member of the Church of Jesus Christ of Latter-day Saints. He spent twelve years doing missionary work for the church in Great Britain, mending shoes for money, and writing articles for the Millennial Star. Among those who he walked to church with at this time was the later Latter-day Saint poet Emily Hill Woodmansee. In 1852, Tullidge briefly renounced his beliefs in Mormonism and joined a deist society, even requesting his name be removed from Church records, but soon returned to Mormonism.

In 1856, the President of the mission, Franklin D. Richards, took note of Tullidge's articles and called him from proselytizing to work in the Liverpool editorial office of the Millennial Star under the incoming president, Orson Pratt. While in Liverpool, he felt a calling to move to Utah and write a biography of Joseph Smith.

=== Emigration to Utah ===
Tullidge emigrated to Utah Territory in 1861. He approached Brigham Young enthusiastically with ideas for improving the literary quality of Utah but was disappointingly met with little encouragement or response. He approached Wilford Woodruff and George A. Smith and received permission to use their journals for his planned biography of Smith. Tullidge had been impressed with a story he heard from Orson Hyde, telling of heavenly voices accompanying the appointment of Brigham Young to the first presidency of the LDS Church. He was troubled by the lack of evidence in the journals for this event and after discussion with Woodruff, became convinced this claim was false.

On November 15, 1862, he was called as a president of the sixty-fifth Quorum of the Seventy.

In October 1864, he began publishing a literary magazine with his friend Elias L. T. Harrison called Peep O'Day, the first to be published west of the Missouri. A purpose of the magazine was to push the church away from perceived theocracy, and create a new culture led by the example of Mormonism. Editorials by Tullidge were criticized by Brigham Young, increasing Tullidge's disgruntlement with what he felt was Young's autocratic style. In a time when animosity between Mormons and non-Mormons was increasing, the magazine advocating for unity was not popular and did not last for a full year, publishing just five issues.

The failure of his magazine and pressure to produce sent him into a depression and heavy drinking, that in the words of Tullidge, "nearly sent me to the grave". He was living with Wilford Woodruff at the time, and received several healing blessings from Woodruff. Upon what he felt was a miraculous recovery from an illness in 1866, he went east, and wrote for a New York Magazine called the Galaxy for the next two years. His articles were frequently about Mormonism, portraying them in a positive light and attempting to bridge the cultural divide between Mormons and the rest of the United States. Orson Pratt visited him on his way back from his English mission. In 1867, Tullidge embarked on a four-month mission to several eastern cities.

On his 1868 journey back to the territory of Utah, he stopped on the way to visit Emma Smith, the widow of Joseph Smith. He came away convinced she was in error, but also sympathetic, promising himself that he would never write about her disrespectfully.

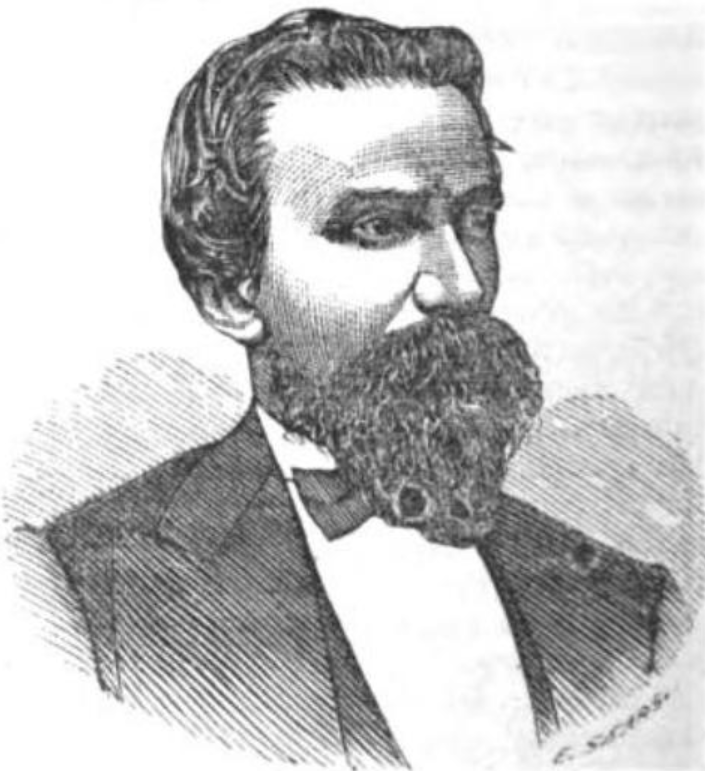
Portrait of Edward Tullidge

=== Godbeite movement ===
Upon returning to the Utah territory, he became friends with the future leaders of the Godbeite movement, including William S. Godbe. Tullidge and Elias Harrison were patronized by Godbe, and started a new magazine called the Utah Magazine. When Harrison and Godbe went to New York for a rest, Tullidge continued on alone with the magazine. While in New York, Godbe and Harrison said they received audible revelations convincing them that the LDS Church had gone astray under Brigham Young, neglected spiritual duties and focused too much on worldly kingdom building. When Godbe and Harrison returned to Utah, they formed a revolt against some of the secular policies of Young.

Tullidge for his part had been somewhat supportive of Young's economic policies, and had developed a friendly relationship with Young, but joined his friends in the revolt and wrote a history of world figures that differed from Mormonism's historical view. When seven of the writers of the Utah Magazine were arraigned for a church disciplinary action, Young personally intervened and dismissed the charges against only Tullidge. At the trial of Godbe and Harrison, Tullidge pleaded with them to reconcile rather than be excommunicated, stating "My own heart never yearned so much towards Brigham as on the trial in question," and that Young was "the great man who has so long been to us in the position of a father."

Godbe and Harrison did not reconcile, and were excommunicated for apostasy. Tullidge resigned his membership in solidarity in an open letter to Brigham Young, writing "For years I have tried to shun the issues of this day ... for theoretically I have been a believer in republican institutions and not in a temporal theocracy." The Utah Magazine changed into a newspaper, called The Mormon Tribune, and eventually renamed The Salt Lake Tribune. Tullidge became an influential proponent of the New Movement, particularly in the eastern United States press. The Godbeite's formed a new church, called the "Church of Zion", and within this church Tullidge was appointed as a President of the First Council of the Seventy and a member of the Salt Lake Stake Presidency. During these years Tullidge wrote disparagingly of Young, to the point that years later he wrote Young an apology for his words.

Tullidge participated outwardly in religious organizations but at this time had "an unbelief of eight years", that he had a "philosophical state of religion" and did not accept "the mission of any special prophet."

By the early 1870s, Tullidge began to participate less in the New Movement. Godbe and Harrison increasingly began to embrace Spiritualism, which Tullidge did not agree with, publicly accusing Godbe and Harrison of betraying the original principles of the movement. Tullidge turned his focus onto other projects, including a play on the life of Oliver Cromwell, and went East to promote it. In 1871 he returned to Utah and became an associate editor of what was now the Salt Lake Tribune. Tullidge still hoped the Godbeite faction and the LDS Church could be reconciled, but as the Tribune became more oppositional, Tullidge lost his editorship in 1873.

Tullidge began to write a series of biographies, his first one on Brigham Young. Although Tullidge self identified as an apostate, he reconciled with his earlier Church. Young wrote that Tullidge "had suffered enough" and gave him access to historical materials. His book "Life of Brigham Young: or, Utah and Her Founders" was published in 1876. This was followed by "Women of Mormondom" in 1877, which included biographies of prominent Mormon women, and advocated for women's suffrage.

=== Reorganized Church of Jesus Christ of Latter Day Saints ===
In 1878 Tullidge published "The Life of Joseph the Prophet". Young had died in 1877, and the new leader of the LDS Church, John Taylor, was not as sympathetic towards Tullidge. The book gave credit to Joseph F. Smith and Eliza R. Snow for their help reading and revising the manuscript, and Taylor thought it was an opportunistic subterfuge to imply LDS Church sanction of the book. Taylor issued a statement discouraging members from buying the book.

Joseph Smith III, the leader of Reorganized Church of Jesus Christ of Latter Day Saints (RLDS Church) and son of Joseph Smith, wrote to Tullidge expressing his approval of the biography. Tullidge traveled to Missouri and in late 1879 became a member of the RLDS Church. He was ordained an elder, acted as a clerk at general conference, preached in congregations and became the RLDS historian. He revised his biography of Joseph Smith, adding sections denying polygamy, inferences that Brigham Young was not the rightful successor to Smith, and other expansions on RLDS Church history. The biography was published by the RLDS Church and became its history up to that time.

During this time, Tullidge wrote a letter to the President of the United States, Rutherford B. Hayes asking him to appoint Joseph Smith III as governor of Utah, a move that he said would destroy, "Polygamic Theocracy."

=== Return to Utah ===
The RLDS Church called Tullidge on a mission to Utah in October 1879. Perhaps surprisingly to him, Tullidge was welcomed back by the population of Utah, and his devotion to the RLDS Church fizzled. He was commissioned by leading members of the LDS Church to write an important "History of Salt Lake City", published a new magazine "Tullidge's Quarterly Magazine", and in 1889 a history of the intermountain west. It was a difficult time in the state of Utah, and several of these ventures were not financially successful. With a house facing foreclosure, and a possible bankruptcy, he wrote several letters to Wilford Woodruff, begging for assistance. The LDS Church responded by buying fifty copies of his Salt Lake City history, and fifty more copies of his intermountain west history. There is evidence that other assistance was also provided.

Tullidge's alcoholism increased and at the age of 65, on May 22, 1894, he died.

== Marriage and family ==
Tullidge had two polygamous marriages that both ended in divorce. The first was to his cousin Jane Bowring, who Tullidge said he married out of "love of family and Mormons." His second marriage was to Eliza Kingsford Bowring, ten years older than him, the widow of his cousin and friend of his mother, possibly to provide her with a home. His final marriage to Susannah Ferguson produced ten children, five of whom survived infancy.

Ferguson became poverty-stricken after the death of Tullidge, and eight years after his death she committed suicide, her body found in a tent with frayed blankets and little to protect her from the cold ground.

== See also ==
- Phrenology and the Latter Day Saint Movement

== Publications ==
=== Books ===
- Tullidge, Edward W. (1876). Life of Brigham Young: Or, Utah and Her Founders. New York: s.n.
- —— (1877). The Women of Mormondom. New York: s.n.
- —— (1878). Life of Joseph the Prophet. New York: Tullidge & Crandall.
- —— (1886). History of Salt Lake City. Tullidge's Histories, vol 1. Salt Lake City: Star Printing Company. Simultaneously self-published by Tullidge as The History of Salt Lake City and Its Founders.
- —— (1889). Tullidge's Histories. Vol II. Salt Lake City: Juvenile Instructor.

=== Periodicals ===
- Tullidge, Edward W.; et al., eds. (1856–1861). Millennial Star (Weekly). Manchester, England: European Mission.
- Harrison, E.L.T.; Tullidge, Edward W., eds. (1864). Peep o' Day (Weekly). Salt Lake City.
- Tullidge, Edward W., ed. (1868–1869). Utah Magazine. Salt Lake City.
- ——, ed. (1870). Mormon Tribune. Salt Lake City.
- ——, ed. (1880–1885). Tullidge's Quarterly Magazine. Salt Lake City: Star Printing Co.
- ——, ed. (1888). The Western Galaxy (Monthly). Salt Lake City: E. W. Tullidge.

=== Articles ===
- Tullidge, Edward W. (October 1866). "Views of Mormondom, By a Mormon Elder". The Galaxy. 2. W.C. and F.P. Church: 209–214.
- —— (October 1866). "The Mormon Commonwealth, By a Mormon Elder". The Galaxy. 2. W.C. and F.P. Church: 351–364.
- —— (November 1866). "The Mormons. History of Their Leading Men". American Phrenological Journal and Life Illustrated. 44 (5). Fowler and Wells: 144–151.
- —— (September 1867). "Brigham Young and Mormonism, By a Mormon Elder". The Galaxy. 4 (5). W.C. and F.P. Church: 541–549.
- —— (February 1869). "Woman's Sphere in Utah". American Phrenological Journal and Life Illustrated. 49 (2). Fowler and Wells: 82–83.
- —— (November 1870). "William H. Hooper, The Utah Delegate and Female Suffrage Advocate". Phrenological Journal and Life Illustrated. 51. Samuel R. Wells: 328–333.
- —— (January 1871). "The Mormons: Who and What They Are". The Phrenological Journal and Life Illustrated. 52 (1). Fowler & Wells: 38–45.
- —— (May 1871). "The Utah Gentiles—Who and What They Are". The Phrenological Journal and Life Illustrated. 52 (5). Fowler & Wells: 337–343.
- —— (July 1871). "Leaders in the Mormon Reform Movement". The Phrenological Journal and Life Illustrated. 53 (1). Fowler & Wells: 30–40.
- —— (September 1871). "The Reformation in Utah". Harper's New Monthly Magazine. 43 (1): 602–610.
- —— (January 1, 1877 – June 24, 1878). "Chapters from the Life of Prest. Brigham Young". Millennial Star (70 part series). 39–40.

=== Plays ===
- Tullidge, Edward W.; John Shanks Lindsay; Niel Warner (1870). Oliver Cromwell: An Historical Play, In Five Acts.
- —— (1875). Ben Israel: Or, From Under the Curse; a Jewish Play in Five Acts. Salt Lake City: J.C. Graham. (1887 edition by Star Printing Company)
- —— (1879). Elizabeth of England: A Play in Five Epochs. Salt Lake City: J.C. Graham.
- —— (1888). Napoleon: A Play. s.n.
