= Daft Block =

Historic building in Salt Lake City, Utah, U.S.

- U.S. National Register of Historic Places
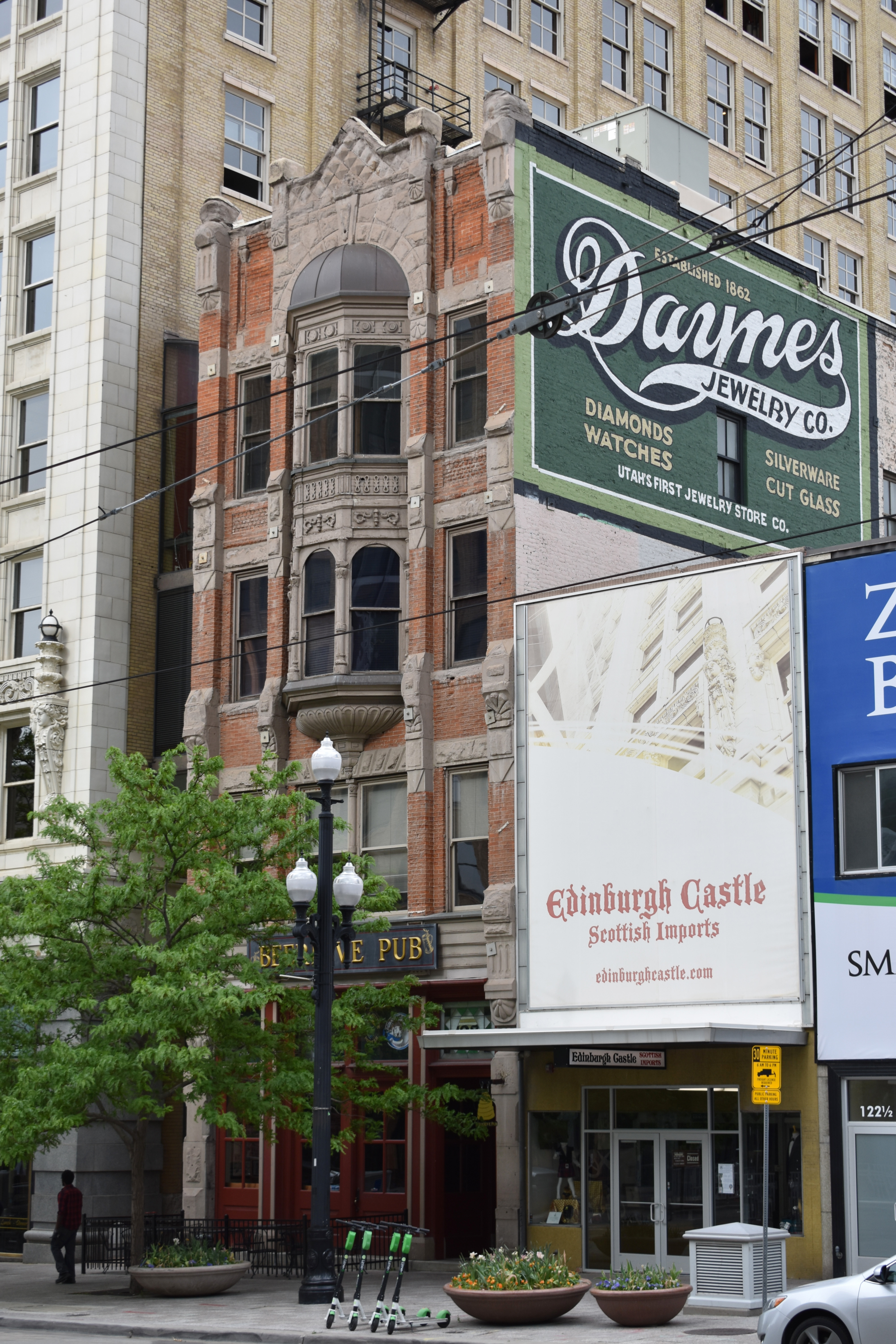
- The Daft Block in 2019

- Location within Utah Location within the United States
- Location: 128 S. Main St., Salt Lake City, Utah
- Coordinates: 40°45′59″N 111°53′26″W
- Area: less than one acre
- Built: 1889
- Architect: Harrison, Elias L.T.; Nichols, H.W.
- Architectural style: Richardsonian Romanesque
- NRHP reference No.: 76001823
- Added to NRHP: May 28, 1976

The Daft Block, also known as the Daynes Jewelry Building, in Salt Lake City, Utah, is a 4-story Richardsonian Romanesque commercial building designed by Elias L. T. Harrison and H.W. Nichols and constructed 1887–1889. The brick building is trimmed with sandstone sills and lintels, and it features a prominent, two-story bay window. Above the bay window is a decorative sandstone pediment. The building was added to the National Register of Historic Places in 1976.

An early tenant of the Daft Block was the Salt Lake 5 & 10 Cent Store, and in 1908 Daynes Jewelry Company purchased the building. The Daft Block later was connected to the adjacent Kearns Building by a steel and glass passageway, otherwise the building shows few alterations.

Sarah Ann Daft (1828–1906) and her husband, E.J. Daft, immigrated to Utah from England in 1856. After E.J. Daft died in 1881, Mrs. Daft became active in business, owning real estate and investing in securities and mining interests. She commissioned the Daft Block in 1887.

== See also ==
- Sarah Daft Home for the Aged, NRHP listing in 2002
