= Sarah Daft Home for the Aged =

Historic building in Salt Lake City, Utah, U.S.

- U.S. National Register of Historic Places
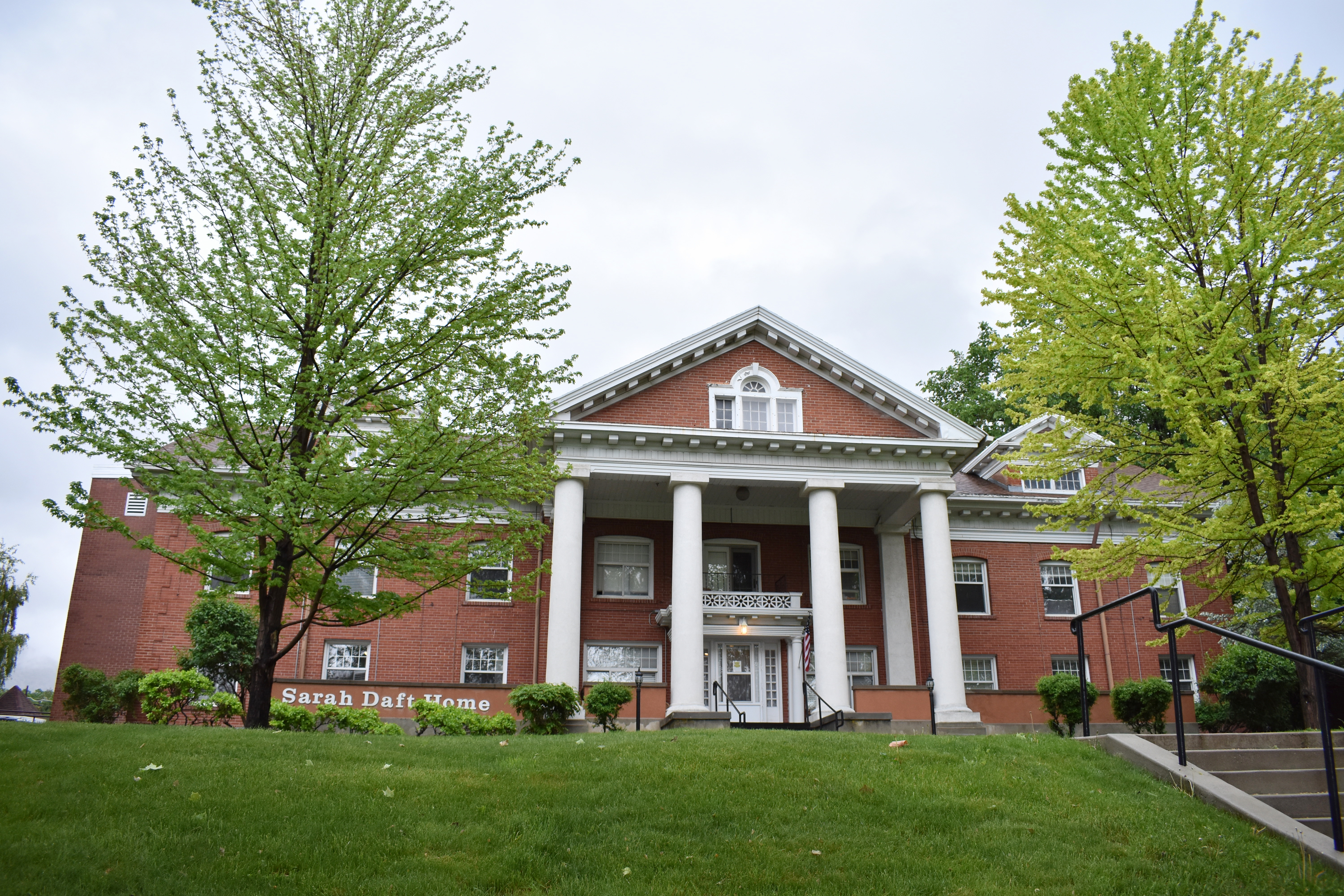
- The Sarah Daft Home in 2019

- Location within Utah Location within the United States
- Location: 737 S. 1300 East, Salt Lake City, Utah
- Coordinates: 40°45′12″N 111°52′36″W
- Area: 2 acres (0.81 ha)
- Built: 1914
- Architect: Lepper, William H.
- Architectural style: Colonial Revival
- NRHP reference No.: 02001041
- Added to NRHP: September 12, 2002

The Sarah Daft Home for the Aged in Salt Lake City, Utah, is a Colonial Revival building designed by William H. Lepper and constructed in 1914. The Daft Home was built with funds provided by Sarah Ann Daft, whose will in 1906 specified the founding of a retirement center. The home is regarded as the first of its kind in Utah, and it was added to the National Register of Historic Places in 2002.

In 1911 the Sara Daft Home Association was formed to secure release of funding from the trustees of the Sara Daft estate, and in 1912 the association leased a house near the corner of 3rd Avenue and Q Street. The first resident of the home was Margaret Tileston, a Civil War nurse who received a commendation from President Lincoln. Tileston also became the first resident to die at the home.

In 1913 workers placed the cornerstone at the home's permanent location, and the Sarah Daft Home opened in 1914. Originally the home provided space for 22 residents, and later expansions allowed for 39 residents.

== See also ==
- Daft Block
