= Elias L. T. Harrison =

American architect

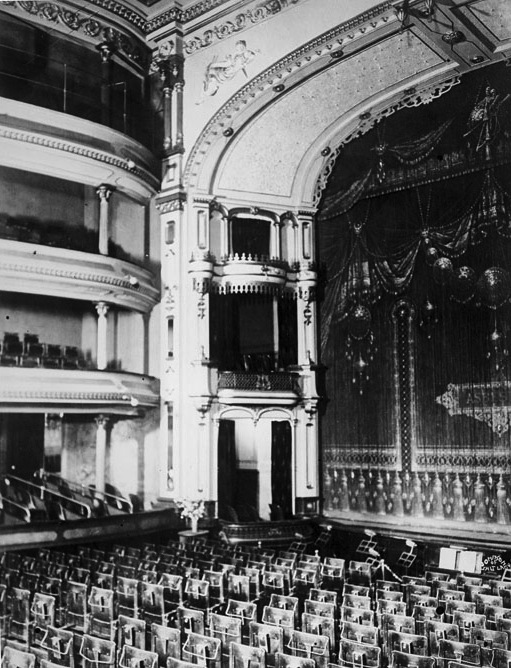
Interior of the Salt Lake Theatre designed by E.L.T. Harrison under the direction of Brigham Young

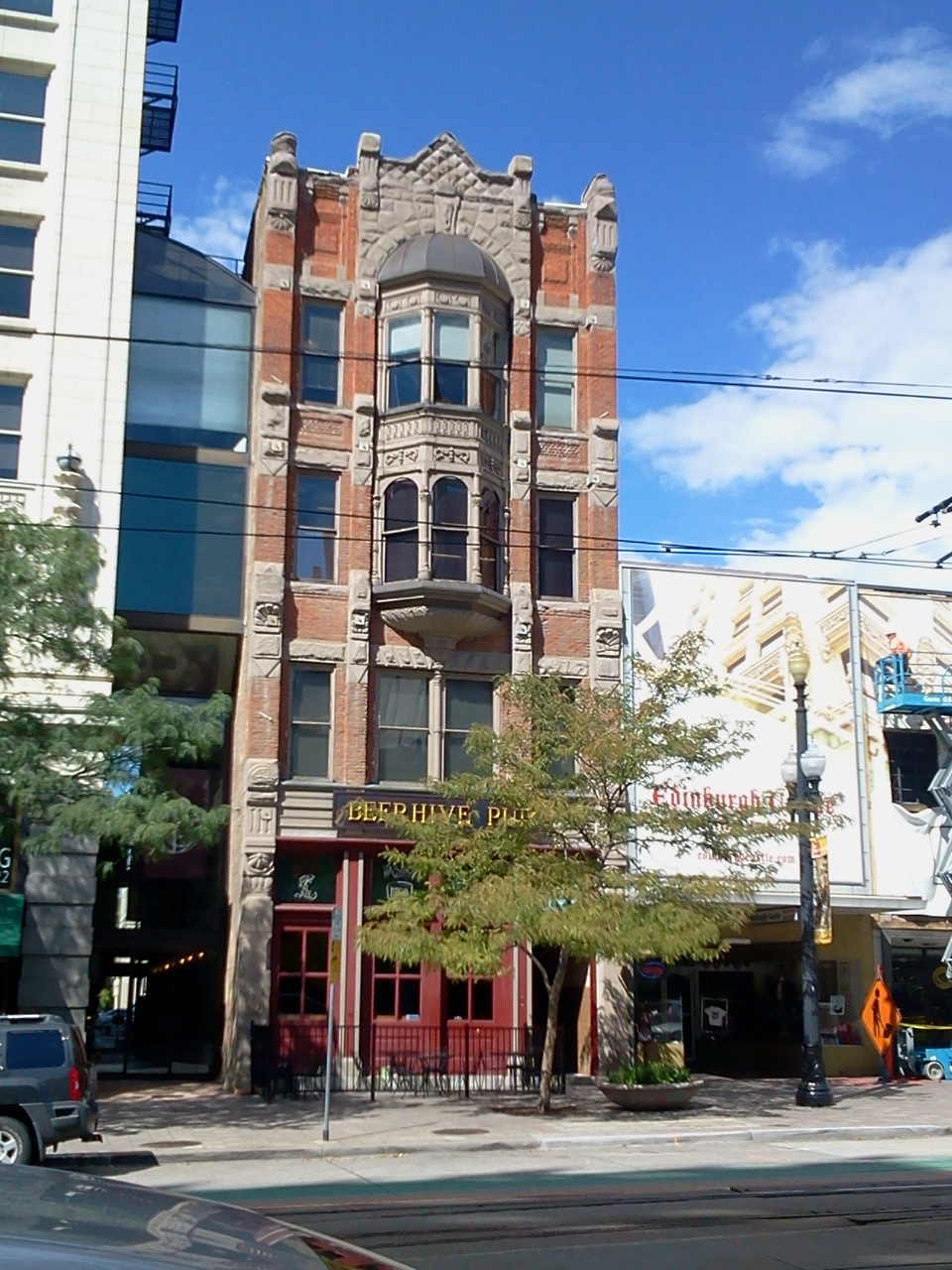
Daft Block at 128 S. Main Street in Salt Lake City, Utah designed by E.L.T. Harrison and listed on the National Register of Historic Places

Elias Lacy Thomas Harrison (March 27, 1830 in Barking, England – May 22, 1900) was an architect and writer in Salt Lake City, Utah, who became important in the history of Utah and the Latter Day Saint movement.

Harrison converted to the Church of Jesus Christ of Latter Day Saints in England in the 1840s in part due to the preaching of Orson Pratt. He was baptized by Orson Pratt. In England, he became friends with Edward Tullidge, the editor and writer of the Millennial Star. He was head of the church bookstore in London. He was President of the London Conference. He immigrated in 1861 with his niece, Alice Harrison, sailing on the ship "Monarch of the Sea." After immigration to Utah Territory, Harrison and Tullidge were co-editors of the Peep O' Day, believed to be the first magazine in the Intermountain West. Harrison and Tullidge, along with William Godbe, started the Mormon Tribune, which later became The Salt Lake Tribune. Harrison was eventually excommunicated by the church and was influential in the formation of the Godbeites or "New Movement". He wrote the text for a hymn in the Latter-day Saint Hymnal "Sons of Michael, He approaches."

== Architect ==
Harrison's architectural works include the Daft Block, Salt Lake Theatre interior, Walker's Store, Walker Brother's Bank, and the Godbe-Pitts Company Store. He also designed his own home, sometimes referred to as "the castle" and located in the Capitol Hill Historic District at 10 West 300 North in Salt Lake City. The Daft Block is his only existing work on the National Register of Historic Places.
