= William S. Godbe =

British Mormon leader (1833–1912)

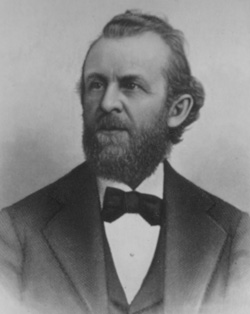

Founder The Church of Zion (Godbeites)
- 1868 – 1880s

Personal details
- Born: William Samuel Godbe; June 26, 1833; Middlesex, England
- Died: August 1, 1902 (aged 69); Brighton, Utah, United States
- Spouse(s): Charlotte I. Cobb
- Parents: Samuel Godbe; Sarah LaRivier

William Samuel Godbe (June 26, 1833 – August 1, 1902) was a British convert to the Church of Jesus Christ of Latter-day Saints (LDS Church). He is remembered for leading a Mormon faction called the Church of Zion, better known as the "Godbeites".

== Biography ==
Godbe was born in Middlesex, England, to Samuel Godbe, a music professor, and Sarah LaRiviere, a descendant of French Huguenots. Godbe was one of at least five children, and his father died when he was eleven. Godbe's uncle Daniel Grant, an engineer, took him in and taught the boy elements of his trade. Godbe was attracted to classics and travel literature, and by his early teens Godbe earned a living on the sea.

By 1850, Godbe was an experienced sailor who had traveled Western Europe, visited Constantinople, and the shores of Brazil and Africa. Godbe then became bound to a captain who, after retiring from the sea, worked the dock at Kingston upon Hull. In Hull, Godbe encountered Parley P. Pratt, an LDS missionary. By June 1850, Godbe was baptized, against the counsel of his immediate family.

Like most converts, Godbe emigrated to the LDS Church's headquarters in territorial Utah. As a seaman, he worked his way to New York City, then purchased his way by ferry from Albany to Chicago in 1851. From there Godbe walked to Kanesville, Iowa (now Council Bluffs). Too late to join an immigrant company, Godbe traveled with merchant Thomas S. Williams, who was bringing goods west. Godbe arrived in Salt Lake City the final week of October 1851.

Godbe kept his ties with Williams and was offered employment by the successful merchant. In the early 1850s, Godbe was dispatched to San Francisco, California, acting as Williams' agent and perhaps forming ties with John M. Horner, a Mormon businessman in the city. In 1854, Godbe traveled east with Williams' express mail entrepreneur Ben Holladay, returning with 22 wagons of merchandise to start his own sundry and drug store, supposedly the first between the Missouri River and San Francisco. Godbe's business sense propelled him to be in the upper 5% of Utah Territory income, with total assets of over $300,000 by 1870.

== Formation of The Church of Zion ==
In 1868, Godbe and other Mormon merchants began criticizing the economic demands and policies of Brigham Young in Utah Magazine, a periodical that would eventually become The Salt Lake Tribune. That same year, Godbe traveled with his friend (architect, publisher, and fellow Latter-day Saint) Elias L. T. Harrison on an extended business trip to New York. At the time, both men were beginning to question their beliefs in the LDS Church, especially the idea that the church's president (whom members looked to as God's prophet on earth) was infallible.

In New York, the two men began attending séances in the hopes of obtaining wisdom and direction from former LDS leaders such as Joseph Smith and Heber C. Kimball who had died. Through the services of a spiritual medium, the men claimed to receive visitations from both Joseph Smith and Heber C. Kimball; also Peter, James, John, and Solomon from the Bible; and finally the German naturalist Alexander Humboldt. The spirits of Smith and Kimball apparently instructed Godbe and Harrison to reform the LDS Church, while the spirit of Humboldt told the two men he had important information for them that would revolutionize the world's understanding of evolution (a common theme of 19th Century Spiritualism).

Upon returning to Salt Lake, the two men intensified their criticism of the LDS Church in Utah Magazine. On October 25, 1869, they were called before a council of Mormon leaders and tried for apostasy. Brigham Young reportedly gave Godbe the option of selecting his own jury, including one consisting entirely of women and children, if he so desired. Godbe refused the offer, claiming that the composition of the jury would unlikely affect the trial's outcome. At the conclusion of the trial, Godbe and Harrison were excommunicated from the church.

Later known as the "Godbeites", Godbe and several of his followers soon formed The Church of Zion. Initially the new church based its practices around traditional LDS doctrines, with the intention of reforming those practices and policies that Godbe felt were incorrect. Many of the church's new members became disenfranchised, however, when Godbe and Harrison attempted to modify those doctrines to accommodate tenets of Spiritualism. By the 1880s, Godbe's church had ceased to exist.

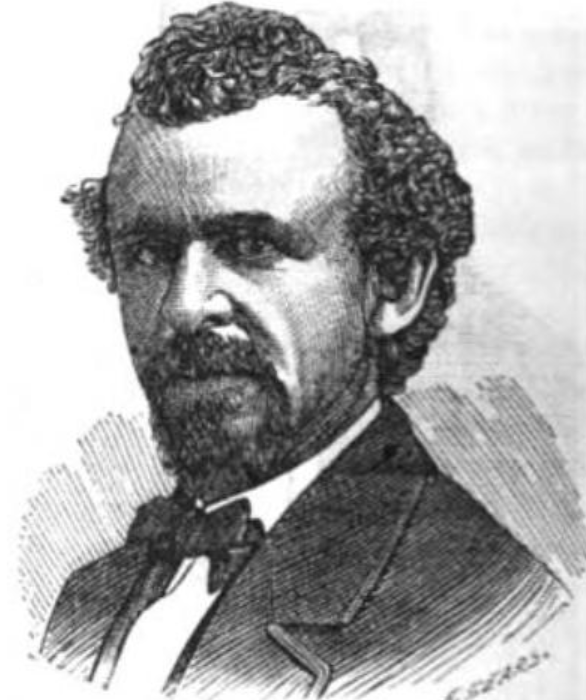
William S Godbe portrait

== Formation of Liberal Party of Utah ==
At the same time, Godbe believed that political reform—namely breaking Brigham Young's control over secular matters in the territory—could help spur religious reform. Thus, in February, 1870, Godbe helped found the Liberal Party of Utah to oppose LDS candidates in political elections. The party, however, fell out of Godbeite control, and became increasingly anti-Mormon instead of reform-minded.

Godbe, pressured in retail by LDS-backed businesses like Zion's Co-operative Mercantile Institution, began running out of liquid assets by 1871 when he had to sell a mine claim near Ophir, Utah to repay his debts. Other mining ventures failed to produce profits until he organized a high-volume silver mine in 1885. This investment turned to naught in 1892 when the worldwide silver crisis hit.

In 1899, he was the Populist Party candidate for mayor of Salt Lake City. Although without illusions of winning the election, he enjoyed entering progressive politics again.

Godbe remained in Salt Lake City in spite of being a social outcast both from Latter-day Saints and from non-Mormons alarmed with his continued practice of polygamy. After the death of Brigham Young in 1877 he wrote, "I think I will reside permanently in Salt Lake, it is pleasant for me there, now."

With failing health, in the summer of 1902 Godbe moved up into nearby Brighton to escape the heat in Salt Lake Valley.
