= Godbeites =

Mormon denomination, 1870–1880s

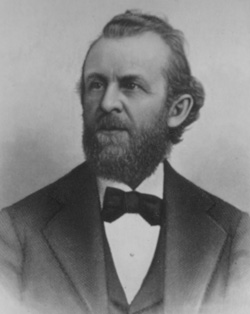
William S. Godbe

The Godbeites were members of the Godbeite Church, officially called the Church of Zion, organized in 1870 by William S. Godbe. This dissident offshoot of the Church of Jesus Christ of Latter-day Saints was aimed toward embracing all belief systems. Known for embracing spiritualism and mysticism, the church died out by the 1880s.

In 1868, Godbe and other Mormon merchants began criticizing the economic demands and policies of Brigham Young in Utah Magazine, a periodical that would eventually become The Salt Lake Tribune. Godbe and several other proponents were excommunicated from the church on October 25, 1869. Godbe wanted to reform the LDS Church and believed that political reform, breaking Young's control over secular matters in the territory, could help spur religious reform. The group was involved in seances to commune with the souls of the dead, and claimed speaking to the spirit of Joseph Smith, and the Savior Jesus Christ.

The Godbeites were the original core of Utah Territory's Liberal Party. However, as it became more explicitly anti-Mormon and critical of polygamy, the Godbeite influence in the party died out.
