= John W. Gallivan =

American publisher and businessman (1915–2012)

- Born: June 28, 1915
- Died: October 2, 2012 (aged 97)
- Occupation: Publisher
- Known for: The Salt Lake Tribune
- Spouse: Grace Mary Ivers (m. 1938)

John W. Gallivan (June 28, 1915 – October 2, 2012) was an American newspaper publisher, cable television pioneer, and civic leader. A major figure in the promotion and development of Salt Lake City and Utah's ski industry, he was instrumental in starting the campaign to bring the 2002 Olympic Winter Games to Salt Lake City. Using his position as publisher of the Salt Lake Tribune, "Jack" Gallivan was the driving force behind numerous civic improvement and development projects including the Salt Palace, the Salt Lake Arts Center, Symphony Hall, The Capitol Theatre, and the promotion of light rail. His many contributions to the economic and cultural life of the city were recognized by the community in the naming of the John W. Gallivan Plaza near the center of downtown.

== Early life ==
Gallivan was born in Salt Lake City June 28, 1915, to Daniel Gallivan and Frances Wilson Gallivan. He lived the first five years of his life in the mining town of Park City, Utah. After the death of his mother in 1921, Gallivan would live with his mother's half-sister, Mrs. Thomas (Jennie) Kearns. Mrs. Kearns was the widow of Utah Senator Thomas Kearns, an owner of the famous Silver King Coalition Mines in Park City and owner of the state's largest newspaper, The Salt Lake Tribune. Gallivan spent part of his early life in the Kearns home on South Temple Street in Salt Lake - now the Utah State Governor's Residence.

== Education ==
Gallivan received his primary education from the Catholic Sisters of the Holy Cross at the Cathedral School in Salt Lake City and later the Peralta Grammar School and Williard Jr. High School in Oakland, California. Between 1930 and 1933 Gallivan attended Bellarmine College Prep in San Jose, California. He then attended the University of Notre Dame majoring in English. Upon his graduation in 1937 he was offered a job at the Chicago Tribune, but upon informing Mrs. Kearns of the offer, Gallivan said she told him bluntly, "I didn't pay for your education so you could work at the Chicago Tribune."

== Career ==
Jack Gallivan began working for the Kearns Tribune Corporation in Salt Lake City in 1937 and would continue at the paper for the next 60 years. Over that time he would work in nearly every department of the Tribune's operations. From 1948 to 1960 he served as Assistant Publisher to John F. Fitzpatrick and Secretary of the corporation. He managed many early Tribune investments, including KALL Radio, KUTV Television and the television equipment supplier TeleMation. Fitzpatrick had secretly negotiated agreements leading up to the founding of the Newspaper Agency Corporation and the joint operation agreements reached with the Church of Jesus Christ of Latter-day Saints owned Deseret News which was signed on August 30, 1952. (The agreement would also bring on a decade long struggle with the Anti-Trust Division of the U.S. Justice Department.) In 1955, while serving as promotion and special projects director for the Kearns-Tribune Corporation, Gallivan procured a franchise license to build a cable TV system for Elko, Nevada, the first in the Western United States. By the end of the decade the Tribune Corporation was operating 5 systems in Nevada under the name Community Television which in 1962 merged with Western Microwave, Inc, a systems in Montana operated by Bob Magness. The new enterprise Tele-Communications Inc. (TCI) flourished and quickly expanded to 32 systems. In 1968 the corporation went public and was soon the world's largest cable company. Gallivan was periodically a director of TCI through its eventual merger with AT&T in 1998.

Following the death of John F. Fitzpatrick on September 11, 1960, Gallivan became the Tribune's publisher, a position he would hold until his retirement from that office in 1984. (Gallivan continued to serve actively as chairman of the board of the Kearns Tribune Corporation until 1997.) In 1970 Gallivan was a key figure in the effort to push through the U.S. Congress, The Newspaper Preservation Act, legislation intended to protect papers with joint operating agreements from anti-trust laws that might have forced some competing papers out of business. Gallivan led many public issue campaigns throughout his career, some more successful than others. He was repeatedly involved in various efforts to revise and modernize Utah's Liquor Laws, including an ill-fated campaign for "Liquor by the Drink." He championed Urban Renewal, City-County Consolidation, Mayor-Council City Government, the Central Utah Project, Downtown Beautification, Zoo-Arts-&-Parks, the original Utah Arts Festival, and Light Rail.

== The winter sports industry and the Salt Lake Olympics ==
By 1960, Gallivan's hometown of Park City was on the verge of becoming a ghost town. The mines had closed, unemployment was high and the entire area was economically depressed. Jack Gallivan had known President Kennedy from his early years as a congressman and was invited to the White House several times in the early 1960s. Following a luncheon President Kennedy hosted for the Utah Publishers Association in 1961, the President turned to Gallivan and asked if he could do anything for Utah. Gallivan replied "we have an application in for an area redevelopment loan for Park City and we'd like the administration to look kindly upon it." At that, the President turned to White House Press Secretary Pierre Salinger and said: "Take care of that." The loan was quickly put in place. It was the beginning of the Park City Ski Resorts, the birth of Utah as a major winter sports destination and the 2002 Salt Lake Olympic Winter Games.

As early as 1964, Jack Gallivan, along with Utah Governor Cal Rampton and Utah Adjutant General Max Rich, began campaigning for the Winter Olympics. Although initially proposed as little more than a publicity stunt for the struggling resorts, the effort slowly gathered momentum and after thirty years of rejection Salt Lake City was finally awarded the 2002 Olympic Winter Games. In recognition of his long struggle to bring the Olympics to Utah, Jack Gallivan, then 86, carried the Olympic torch on a segment of the run to the opening ceremonies.

== Family ==
He and his wife, the late Grace Mary Ivers Gallivan, (married June 30, 1938) are the parents of one daughter, Gay Gallivan McDonough, and three sons, John W. Jr., Michael D., and Timothy. He has nine grandchildren and five great-grandsons Daniel, John William, Henry, Jack and Noah.

== Miscellaneous ==
In 1967 Jack Gallivan, together with Arch Madsen and Joseph Rosenblatt, established the Utah chapter of the National Conference of Christians and Jews (now nationally the National Conference for Community and Justice and, in Utah, the Inclusion Center for Community and Justice). From 1970 to 1973 Gallivan was chairman of the Board of Trustees of the Citizens Conference on State Legislatures. He served as president and director of the Pacific Northwest Newspaper Association from 1961 to 1987. Gallivan was co-organizer of the Salt Lake Downtown Planning Association, co-founder Ski Utah and the Utah Travel Council, co-organizer and member of Olympics for Utah Committee, Journalist in Residence at the Hinckley Institute of Politics, University of Utah, co-founder of the University of Utah Intermountain Organ Bank 1970, co-founder of Bleacher Utes (predecessor of the University of Utah Crimson Club), chair of the executive committee and Board of the University of Utah Hospital in 1979–1989, chair of the University of Utah Health Sciences Council in 1985–1989, co-founder of the University of Utah Hospital Foundation in 1990, chair of the Salt Palace Convention Center and Arena Planning, Funding and Construction Committee in 1966–1969, chair of the Planning, Funding and Construction Committee for Symphony Hall, Capitol Theater, and the Salt Lake Art Center in 1976–1979 and a member of the Utah Statehood Centennial Commission in 1993–1996 that was chaired by Stephen M. Studdert. He has served as director of the Utah Zoological Society and as President of the Utah Symphony Orchestra. He has also chaired numerous campaigns for the Catholic Diocese of Salt Lake City, including the restoration of Salt Lake's Cathedral of the Madeleine. He was named "lifetime honorary director" of the Salt Lake Chamber of Commerce in 1975 and in 1981 that same organization honored Gallivan with the title: "Giant in Our City." In 1988 Gallivan was named by Pope John Paul II as a Papal Knight of the Order of St. Gregory the Great. In 1998 his alma mater University of Notre Dame named The John W. Gallivan Program in Journalism, Ethics & Democracy in his honor.

Gallivan was the founder and chairman of the Board of the Crusade for the Homeless Foundation. He spearheaded campaigns to build the Sunrise Metro Apartments, Grace Mary Manor, and Palmer Court, providing nearly 400 supportive housing units for the chronically homeless in Salt Lake. The fundraising efforts for housing have been turned over to The Road Home in Salt Lake City who stewards The Jack Gallivan Endowment for Homeless Housing. Mr. Gallivan died of natural causes on October 2, 2012, at his home in Park City, Utah.
