= Kearns-Saint Ann Catholic School =

Coordinates: 40.7248°N 111.8788°W

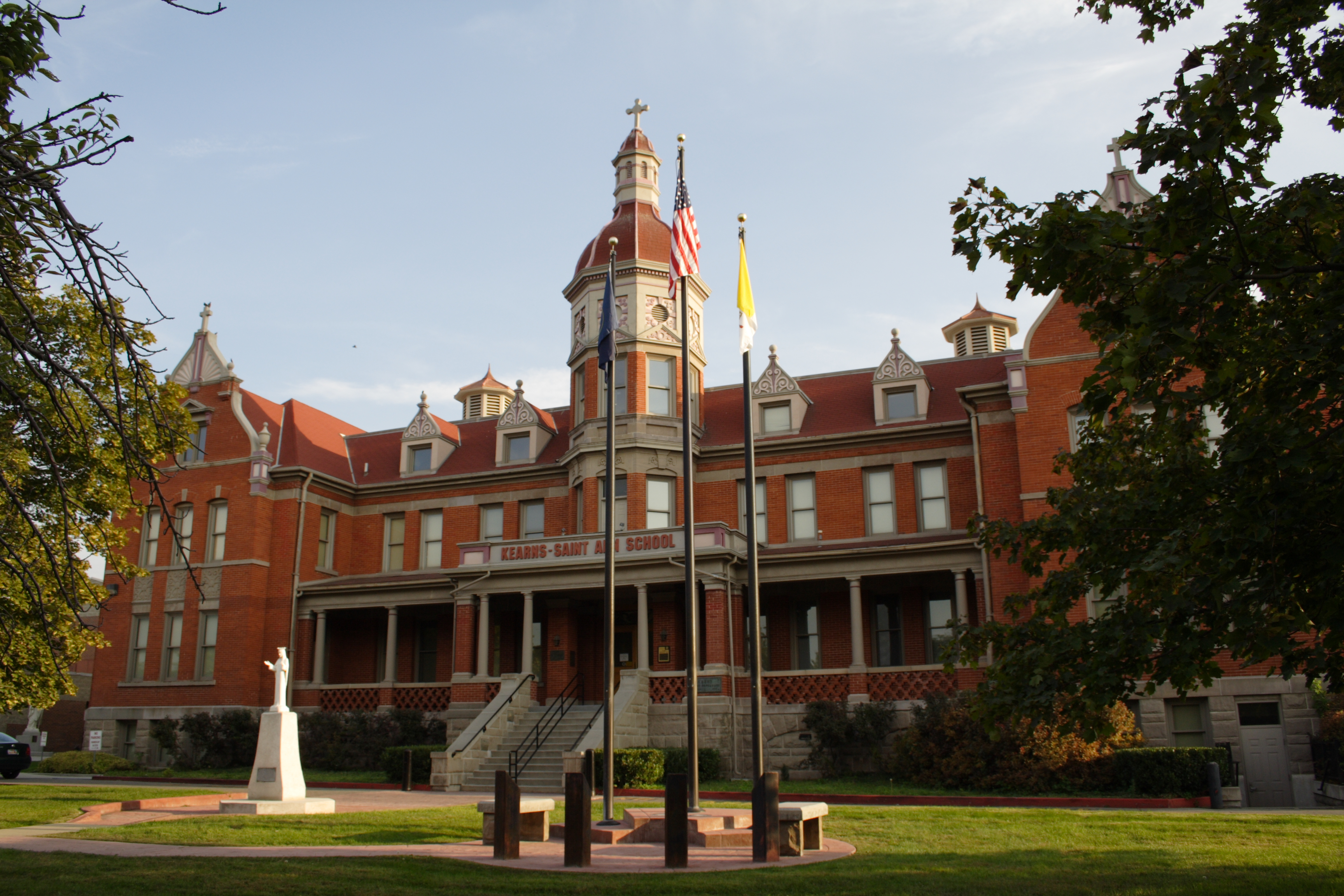

Location
- 439 East 2100 South; South Salt Lake, Utah 84115; United States

Information
- Type: Private, Coeducational
- Motto: Over a Century of Faith, Hope, and Love
- Religious affiliation: Roman Catholic
- Established: 1899
- Grades: PS–8
- Colors: Blue and Gold
- Mascot: Falcons
- Accreditation: Western Catholic Educational Association
- Website: https://ksaschool.weebly.com/

Kearns-Saint Ann School is a Catholic school for preschool to eighth grade students, located in South Salt Lake, Utah. Founded as St. Ann's Orphanage in 1891, it became a parochial school in 1955. The historical school building, completed in 1899, was gifted by Jennie Judge Kearns, wife of mining magnate Thomas Kearns, for whom it is named.

== Kearns' St. Ann's Orphanage ==
=== Thomas Kearns ===
In the late 1800s, Thomas Kearns was one of Utah’s wealthiest and most influential figures. He had made his fortune with his partners, John Judge and David Keith through their business, the Silver King Mine in Park City. He was also the publisher of the Salt Lake Tribune newspaper, and continued his leadership role in early Utah when he became a United States Senator.

=== The Orphanage ===
Due to the high number of mining accidents and disasters in Utah mines, many families were left without a breadwinner in the days when women could not find high-paying jobs, and many children were orphaned. The Sisters of the Holy Cross saw a need for an orphanage and opened one in 1891. Bishop Lawrence Scanlan, of the Catholic Diocese of Salt Lake City, gave the sisters a small, two-story adobe building for the purpose of caring for the orphans.

=== The Kearns' St. Ann's Orphanage Building ===
The orphanage outgrew the structure quickly. Bishop Scanlan tried to acquire land on which to build an orphanage, but encountered financial problems. In 1898, Jennie Judge Kearns, wife of Senator Thomas Kearns, donated $60,000 to the diocese for the purpose of building an orphanage. Her gift covered the entire cost of purchasing the land and construction of the building. The furnishings were provided by other donors, a list of whom was printed in the Deseret News. The acreage on which the orphanage was built consisted of rich farmland where the sisters would grow food for feeding the orphans. Today that land is a baseball field used by children's sports teams for practice and games.

The building was designed and built by noted architect Carl M. Neuhausen, designer of the Cathedral of the Madeleine and the Kearns Mansion, both located in Salt Lake City. He told Bishop Scanlan that he would be glad to give his services free of cost. The cornerstone was laid on August 27, 1899. The next day the deed was officially transferred to the Diocese of Salt Lake for the sum of $10.00. Kearns-St. Ann's Orphanage was dedicated on October 7, 1900, and quickly became home to 92 children and the Sisters of the Holy Cross who cared for them.

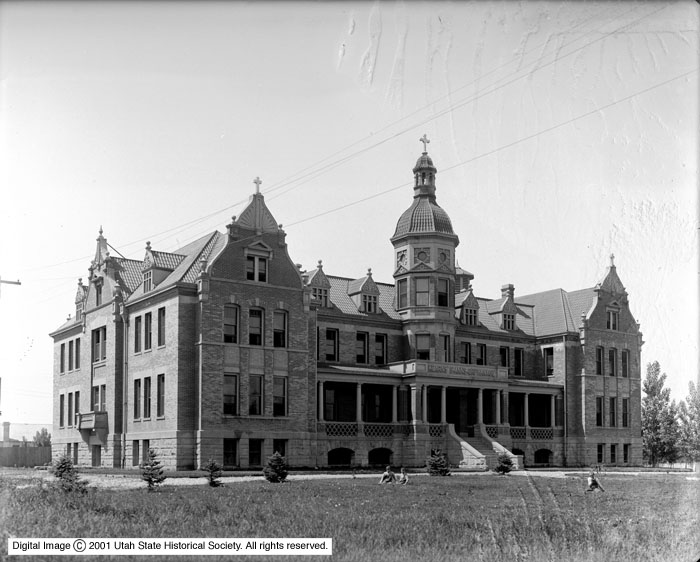
Kearns' St. Ann's Orphanage shortly after opening in 1900

=== Care of the Children ===
Funding for the orphanage was difficult and relied heavily on donations from benefactors in the Salt Lake area. Another wealthy miner, Patrick Phelan, left a large endowment to the orphanage when he died in 1901.

By 1902 the number of orphans had climbed to 127. Any child who was in need of a home was accepted into the orphanage regardless of their religion. The sisters worked with the residents of Salt Lake City to provide a very loving home for the children. Many times, the local residents would provide tickets to the circus or Lagoon (amusement park). Christmas especially showed the generosity of the people of Salt Lake, as no child went without a gift.

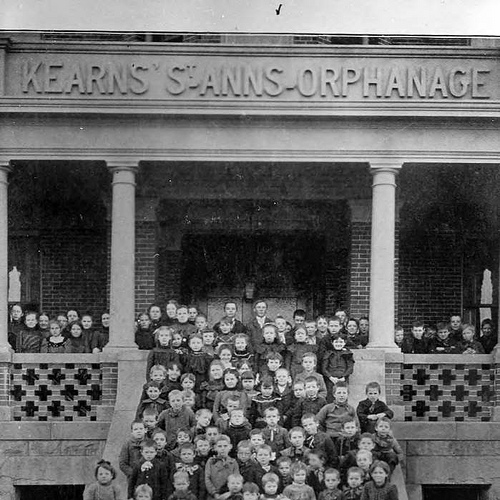
A gathering of the orphans on the steps of the Kearns' St. Ann's Orphanage

Kearns' St. Ann's Orphanage continued operating under the direction of the Sisters of the Holy Cross until 1954, when the Utah State Foster Care System was created, and the need for orphanages no longer existed. However, the legacy of the founders continued when St. Ann's Orphanage was converted into a parochial school beginning in 1955.

== St. Ann's School ==
When St. Ann's School opened in fall of 1955, the leadership transferred from the Sisters of the Holy Cross to the Sisters of Charity of the Incarnate Word. St. Ann’s opened with an enrollment of 240 students in grades kindergarten through 4th grade. A grade was added each year, until students in all eight grades were enrolled. As the number of sisters declined in America, they were replaced with lay-teachers. The sisters continued their presence in the school until the early twenty-first century.

== Kearns-Saint Ann School ==
In 1980 the building was placed on the National Register of Historic Places and is listed on the Utah Division of State History as a historic site. In honor of the founders and benefactors of Kearns' St. Ann's Orphanage, the school was renamed Kearns-Saint Ann School in 1991.

=== Renovation ===
In the early 1990s, St. Ann's School had reached a crisis point over the aging building. A decision had to be made regarding whether to demolish and rebuild the crumbling, nearly century-old building, or renovate it in a way that preserved its historic integrity. Monsignor John J. Sullivan, pastor of St. Ann’s Parish, met with the parish council, and the decision was made to renovate.

Many changes had to be made to bring the building up to the code. Architect James Glascock was hired to design the renovation. The implementation of his design was directed by contractor John Cameron and Cameron Construction.

=== Today ===
Today the school ministers to students in grades Preschool through 8th and serves a diverse student population from varied socio-economic backgrounds. Kearns-Saint Ann School has been called one of the most diverse schools in the state of Utah, with about one-fourth of its students being refugees.
