= Kearns-St. Ann's Orphanage =

- U.S. National Register of Historic Places
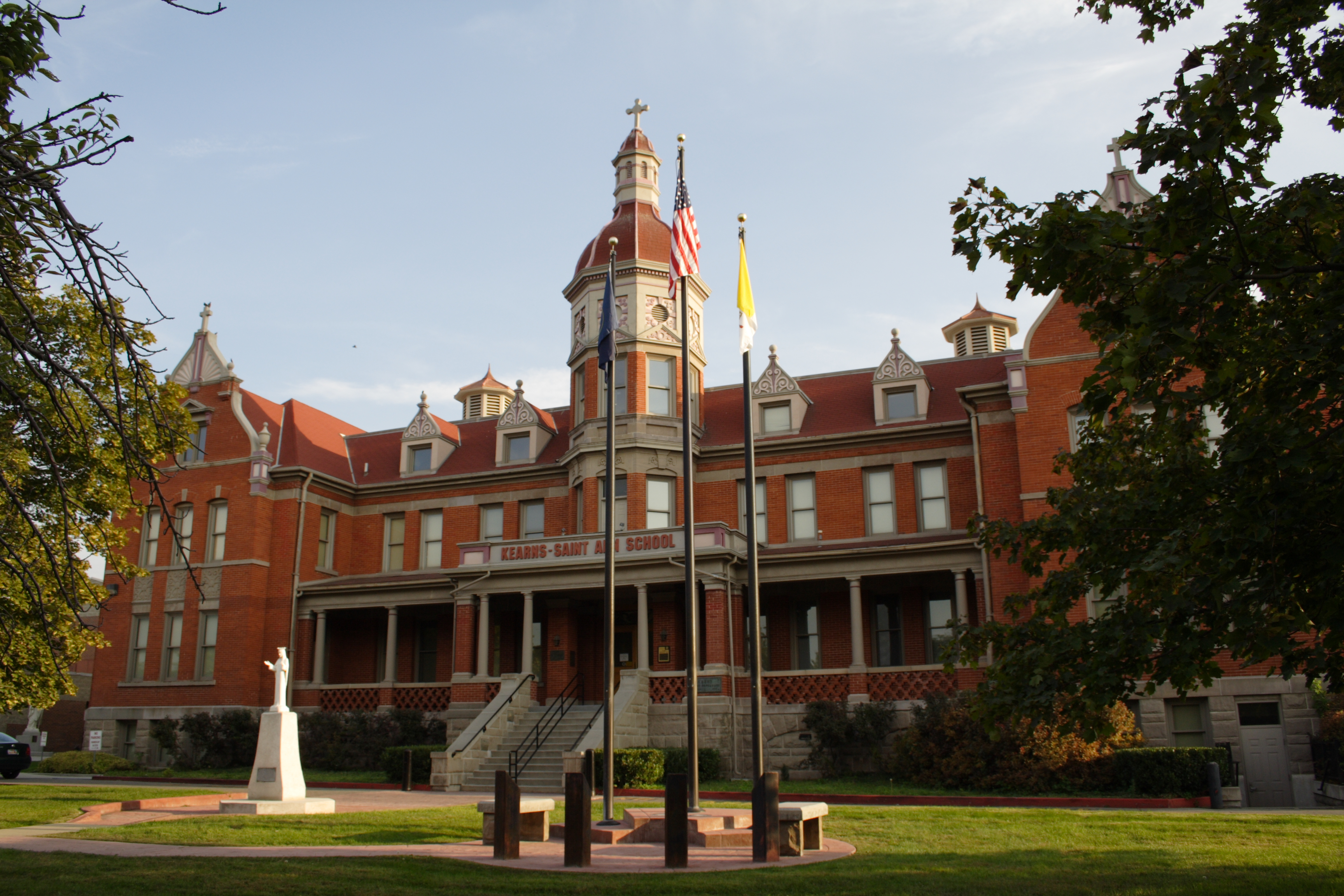
- Photo in 2012

- Location within Utah Location within the United States
- Location: 430 E. 2100 South, South Salt Lake, Utah
- Coordinates: 40°43′30″N 111°52′41″W
- Area: less than one acre
- Built: 1890
- Architect: Neuhausen, Carl M.
- NRHP reference No.: 80003925
- Added to NRHP: October 3, 1980

The Kearns-St. Ann's Orphanage, at 430 East 2100 South in South Salt Lake, Utah, was built in 1890. It was designed by architect Carl M. Neuhausen. Later serving as Kearns-Saint Ann Catholic School, it was listed on the National Register of Historic Places in 1980. According to its NRHP nomination, the orphanage is significant partly for its architecture, with "modest decorative elements allud[ing] to Renaissance and Mannerist" styles, representing "the important educational and religious contributions to Utah society of Bishop Lawrence Scanlan and Thomas and Jennie Kearns".
