= Carl M. Neuhausen House =

Historic house in Salt Lake City, Utah, U.S.

- U.S. National Register of Historic Places
- U.S. Historic district – Contributing property
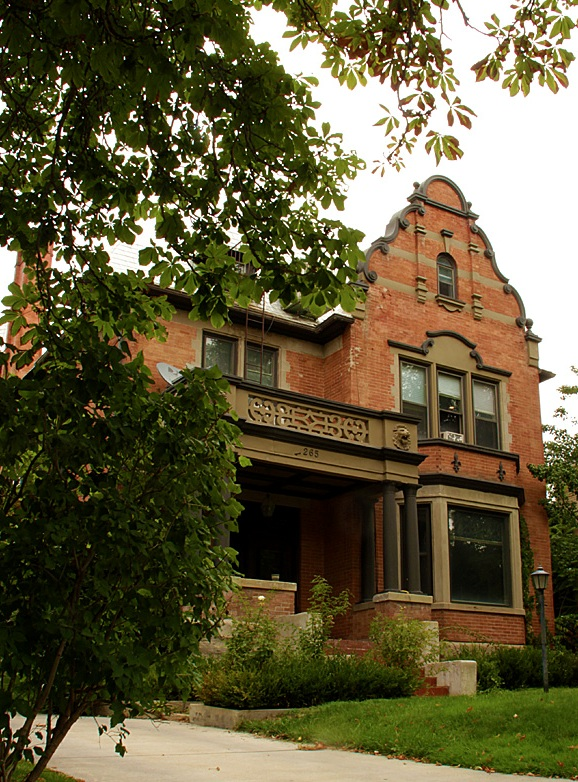
- Carl M. Neuhausen House, September 2012

- Location within Utah Location within the United States
- Location: 1265 East 100 South; Salt Lake City, Utah; United States
- Coordinates: 40°46′4″N 111°51′15″W
- Area: less than one acre
- Built: 1901
- Architect: Neuhausen, Carl M.
- Architectural style: Renaissance, Chateauesque
- Part of: University Neighborhood Historic District (ID95001430)
- NRHP reference No.: 80003932

Significant dates
- Added to NRHP: October 3, 1980
- Designated CP: December 13, 1995

The Carl M. Neuhausen House is a historic house in northeastern Salt Lake City, Utah, United States, that is located within the University Neighborhood Historic District, but is individually listed on the National Register of Historic Places (NRHP).

== Description ==
The house, located at 1265 East 100 South, was designed in Chateauesque style by architect Carl M. Neuhausen and was permitted to be built in 1901. It was listed on the National Register of Historic Places in 1980.

Carl M. Neuhausen, born 1858 in Stuttgart, Germany, was asserted in the NRHP nomination to have been "the only prominent Utah architect to employ the Renaissance spirit and mannerist detailing of the Chateauesque style." He worked for a time with architect Richard K.A. Kletting and then split off to work on his own in 1895. He designed several large buildings in Salt Lake City including the Kearns Mansion and the Cathedral of the Madeleine.

Neuhausen died in the house in 1907 of heart failure, at age 49.

The house was listed on the NRHP on October 3, 1980.

== See also ==
- National Register of Historic Places listings in Salt Lake City
