= John F. Fitzpatrick =

American businessman

John Francis Fitzpatrick
- Born: January 18, 1887; Pottsville, Pennsylvania
- Died: September 1, 1960 (aged 73); Salt Lake City, Utah
- Occupation: Publisher
- Spouse: Eleanor F. Crawford

John Francis Fitzpatrick (January 18, 1887 - September 11, 1960) was the publisher of The Salt Lake Tribune from 1924 to 1960. He created the Newspaper Agency Corporation (NAC) in 1952.

== Early life ==
Fitzpatrick was born January 18, 1887, in Pottsville, Pennsylvania. His father was a railroad engineer. After participating in a strike, his father was blacklisted, and the family moved to Burlington, Iowa. Fitzpatrick graduated from Burlington High School and went to work for the railroad industry, including the Pere Marquette railroad.

He lived in Salt Lake City, Utah for a short time in 1910. He was working as a railroad clerk when Thomas Kearns, former U.S. Senator from Utah (1901–05), mining, banking, railroad and newspaper magnate, bought The Salt Lake Tribune in 1901, founded the Salt Lake Telegram and hired Fitzpatrick as his personal secretary in 1913.

Fitzpatrick married Eleanor F. Crawford in 1914.

Fitzpatrick's grandson, Timothy Fitzpatrick, is the deputy editor and editorial page editor of The Salt Lake Tribune (2013).

== Publisher ==
Following the death of Kearns in 1918, Fitzpatrick worked with the business manager and brother-in-law of Kearns, Frank J. Westcott. Fitzpatrick had a close relationship with Jennie Judge Kearns, owner of the Tribune and president of the Kearns Corporation. Fitzpatrick also reported to her son, Thomas F. Kearns, who remained president of the Tribune. Fitzpatrick officially became publisher of the Tribune upon the death of Ambrose McKay in 1924.

The Salt Lake Tribune had been the voice of the opposition to the Church of Jesus Christ of Latter-day Saints (LDS Church), which owns the other daily paper in Salt Lake City, the Deseret News. Confrontations between the Deseret News and the Tribune eased somewhat during the Tribune regime of Thomas Kearns, flaring only occasionally. When Fitzpatrick became Tribune publisher, "the savage salvos ended once and for all." Fitzpatrick's legacy as the architect of accommodation between members of the LDS Church and non-Mormons in Salt Lake was such that his obituary in Time Magazine was titled "The Peacemaker." In 1937, Fitzpatrick hired his eventual successor, John W. Gallivan.

== Newspaper Agency Corporation ==
By 1947, the Tribune's circulation had increased to 87,237, while that of the Deseret News had fallen to 40,485. The Deseret News was in trouble, so in 1948, the Deseret News started Sunday publication, and a circulation war began. Both papers pushed hard to increase circulation over the next four years, with aggressive promotions that included prize giveaways.

Fitzpatrick had secretly negotiated agreements leading up to the founding of the NAC and the joint operation agreements. Additionally in 1952, Thomas F. Kearns, president and controlling owner of The Salt Lake Tribune, the second of Senator Kearns's four children, decided to get out of the newspaper business. Fitzpatrick needed to sell off of company assets to acquire Kearns's 40 percent interest, or control of the paper would fall out of family hands.

The accommodation reached in 1952, with the Deseret News solved this problem for the Tribune. For the Deseret News, it allowed its continued survival. The Deseret News and the Tribune entered into a joint operating agreement whereby they combined the advertising and printing business of the two papers; editorially they remained separate. The new joint publisher was incorporated as the NAC, and Fitzpatrick was its first president and architect. David O. McKay, president of the LDS Church, viewed this as the only way the church-owned Deseret News could survive. As part of the deal, The Tribune sold the afternoon paper, The Salt Lake Telegram, to the Deseret News; this gave Fitzpatrick the funds to buy out Thomas F. Kearns, the largest stockholder of the Kearns Corporation, owner of the Tribune. The Deseret News went to evening publication, and stopped publishing on Sunday.

== Later years ==
In 1957, the Tribune won a Pulitzer Prize for coverage of an airline collision over the Grand Canyon.

Fitzpatrick also became an important civic leader. He met every Tuesday morning with McKay and Gus P. Backman, the secretary of the Salt Lake Chamber of Commerce. These breakfast meetings started with the creation of the Centennial Commission in the early 1940s, and continued until Fitzpatrick's death.

Fitzpatrick died of a heart attack in his home on September 11, 1960. The next day, in an emergency board meeting the Kearns-Tribune Corporation board elected John W. Gallivan, as Fitzpatrick had not chosen successor, as president of the corporation and publisher of the Tribune. The LDS Church's First Presidency also endorsed Gallivan as president of the NAC.
