= Salt Lake Masonic Temple =

Historic building in Salt Lake City, Utah, U.S.

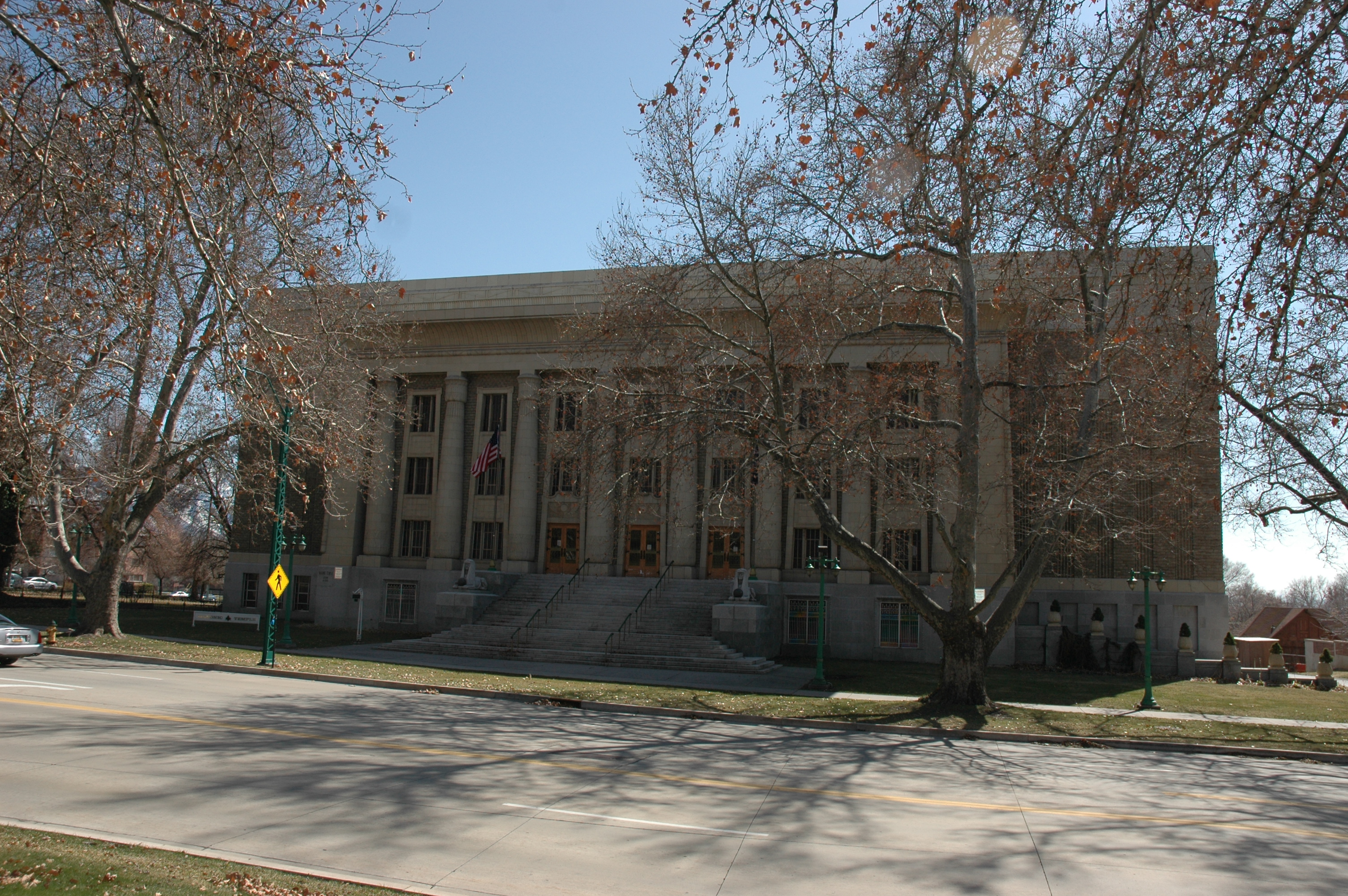
- Salt Lake Masonic Temple, front view from across South Temple Street, March 2010
- Interactive map of the Salt Lake Masonic Temple area

General information
- Architectural style: Egyptian Revival
- Salt Lake Masonic Temple
- U.S. Historic district – Contributing property
- Location within Utah Location within the United States
- Location: South Temple Street; Salt Lake City, Utah; United States
- Coordinates: 40°46′10″N 111°52′11″W
- Area: 119 acres (48.2 ha)
- Built: 1926
- Architect: Multiple
- Architectural style: Mixed (more than 2 styles from different periods)
- Part of: South Temple Historic District (ID82004147)
- Added to NRHP: July 14, 1982
- Location: Salt Lake City, Utah, United States
- Coordinates: 40°46′08″N 111°52′20″W
- Construction started: 1926
- Completed: 1927
- Cost: approximately $250,000.00 (1927)

Design and construction
- Architect: Carl W. Scott

The Salt Lake Masonic Temple is the Masonic headquarters for Utah and is Salt Lake City's best example of Egyptian Revival architecture. It was completed in 1927 and is located in the South Temple Historic District of Salt Lake City, Utah, United States.

== General information ==
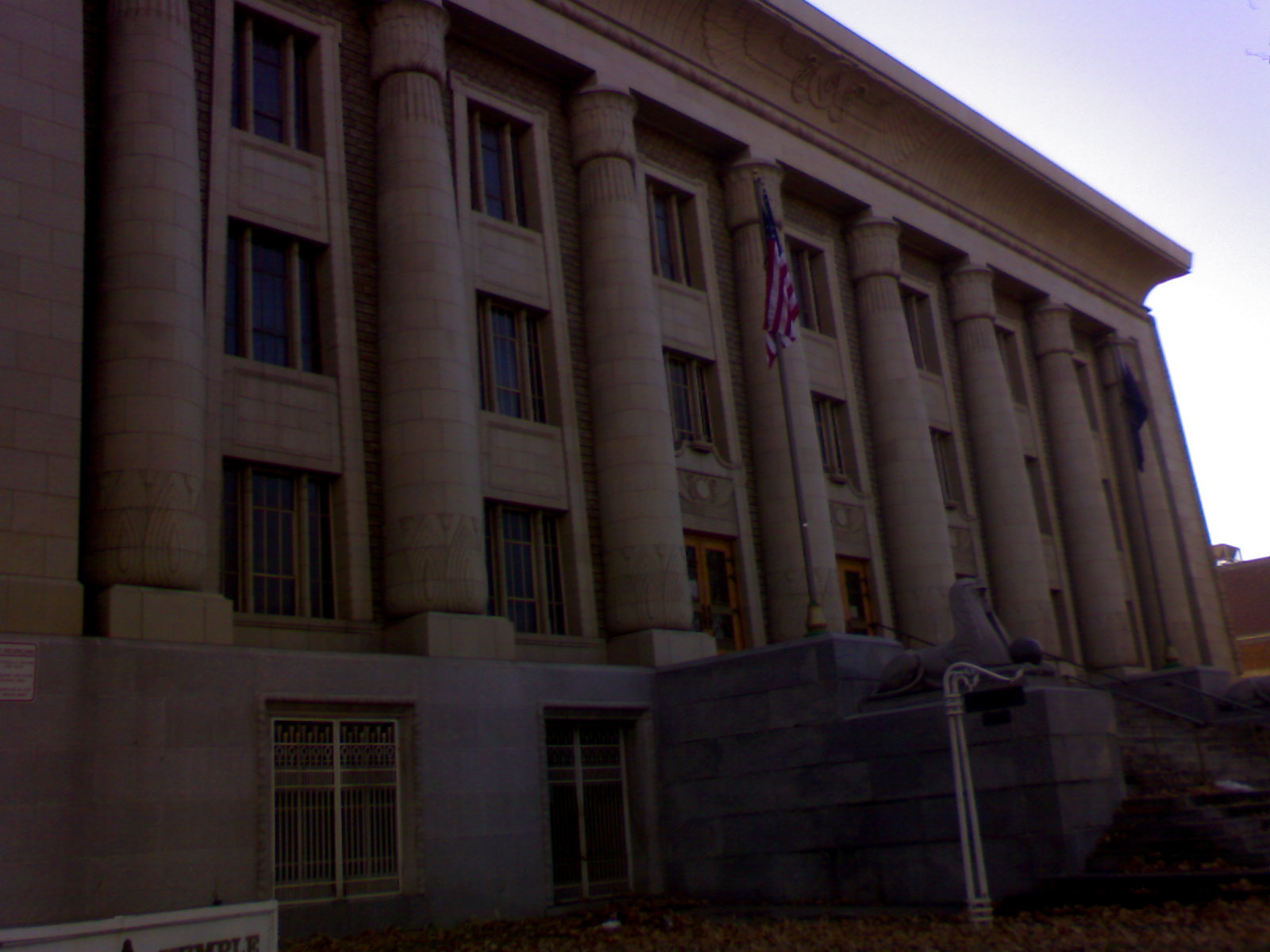
Salt Lake Masonic Temple, December 2007

The Salt Lake Masonic Temple consists of several Lodge rooms, greater and lesser Halls, numerous lounges, a banquet hall, an auditorium, a library and administrative offices. The Temple is currently home to the Most Worshipful Grand Lodge of Free and Accepted Masons of Utah; five Salt Lake City Masonic Lodges (Wasatch Lodge No. 1, Mt. Moriah Lodge No. 2, Argenta Lodge No. 3, Salt Lake Lodge No. 17, and Progress Lodge No. 22); The Orient of Utah of the Ancient and Accepted Scottish Rite of Freemasonry; the Grand York Rite Bodies of Utah and constituent Salt Lake York Rite Bodies (Utah Chapter No. 1, Royal Arch Masons of Utah; Utah Council No. 1, Cryptic Masons of Utah; Utah Commandery No. 1, Knights Templar of Utah); El Kalah Shrine; as well as the Grand Bodies for the ladies and youth organizations.

The building has been in continual use since it opened in 1927 and is maintained and operated by the Salt Lake Masonic Temple Association.

== Usage ==
The primary function of the building is the performance of the various rituals of the several Masonic organizations in Salt Lake City, and to provide a convenient location for administrative functions of the Utah Masonic family. The building is available for use by non-Masonic entities and persons.

== History ==
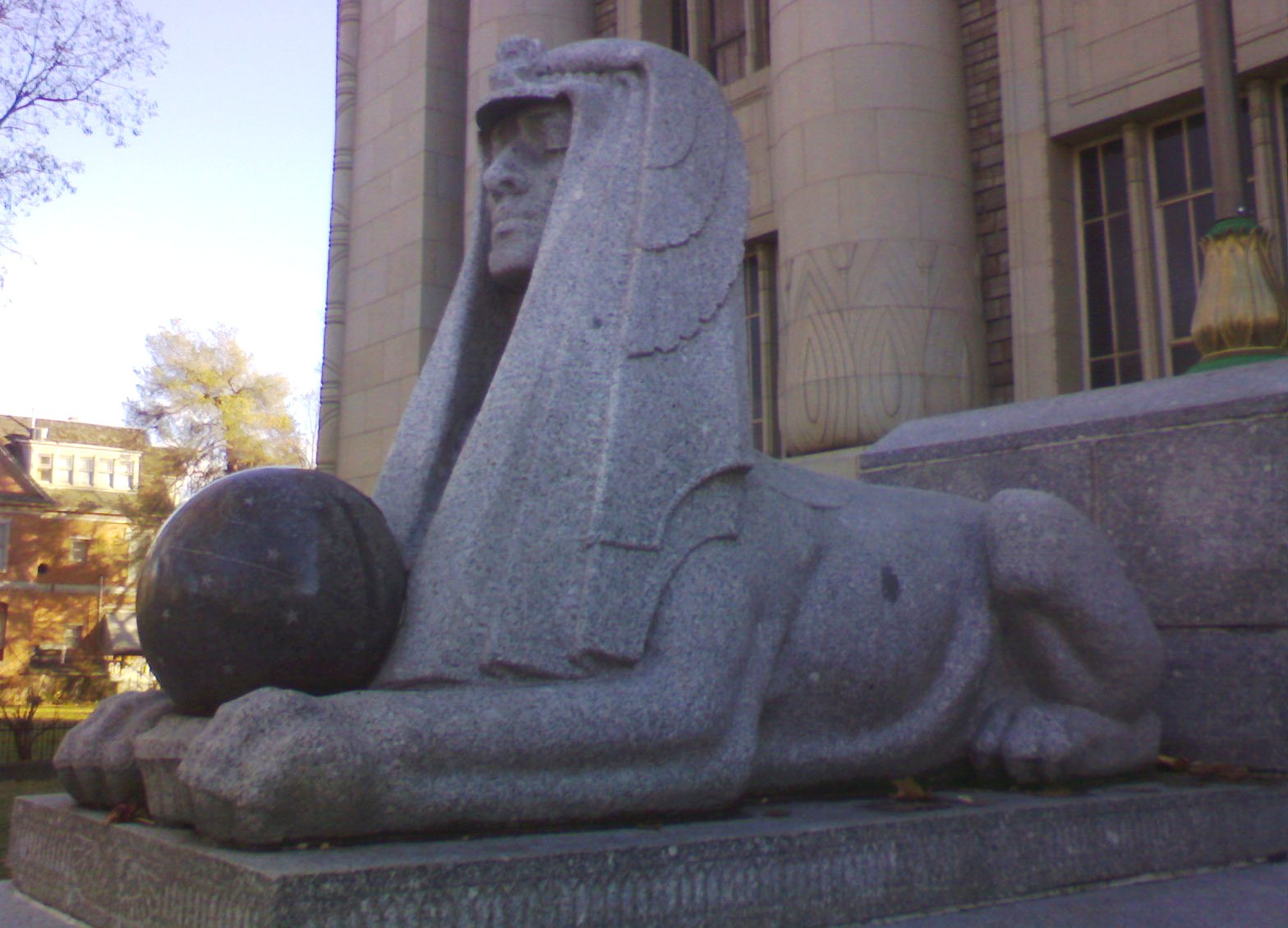
Sphinx in front of SLC Masonic Temple, December 2007

The decision to build the Salt Lake Masonic Temple took shape in the fall of 1920 as the Masonic population in Salt Lake City had outgrown the existing Temple then located at the intersection of 2nd East and 1st South. The architect and Building Committee traveled to other cities reviewing existing Masonic Temples for favorable and unfavorable elements. Ultimately the committee resolved that the Salt Lake Masonic Temple be unique and not copied from existing Temples. By 1925 the plans had been completed, the land was purchased, and the interior furnishings arranged.

Much of the discussion preserved from the planning meetings centers on the amount of Masonic symbolism built into the Temple, and how it should be concealed, if at all.

== Features ==
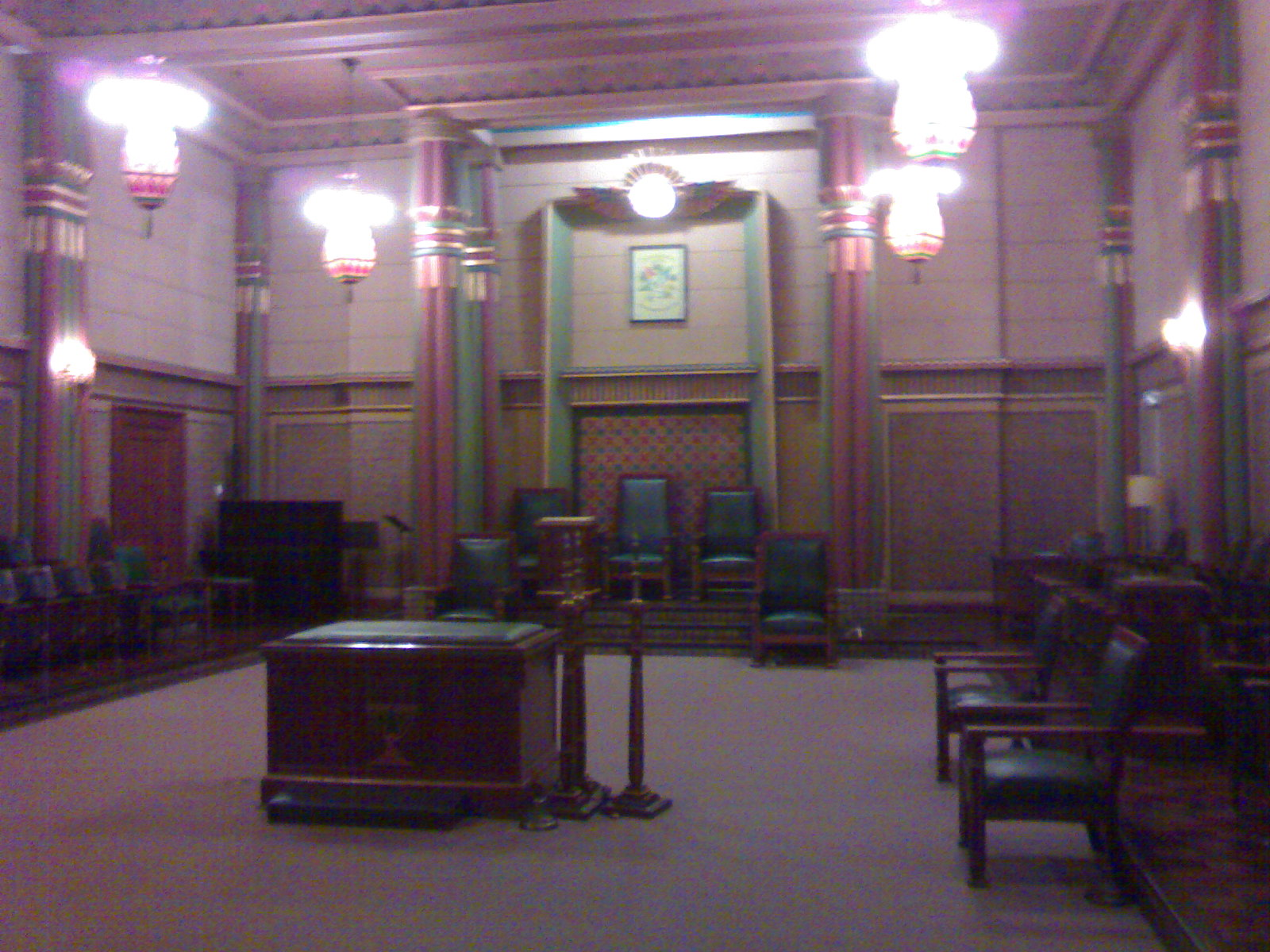
Egyptian Room at Salt Lake Masonic Temple, December 2007

The Salt Lake Masonic Temple has been considered Salt Lake's best example of Egyptian Revival architecture. The Egyptian motif was chosen for several reasons:

1. The Egyptian style was the height of fashion at the time.
2. Existing Temples largely followed elements of the classical orders of architecture, so the Egyptian motif would ensure a unique Masonic experience.
3. It provided ample opportunity to incorporate Masonic symbols without disclosing their presence or disrupting the visual harmony of the edifice.

The exterior of the Temple is composed of "Temple Brick", a brick face specifically designed for the Salt Lake Masonic Temple, that subsequently became a popular decorative architectural element.

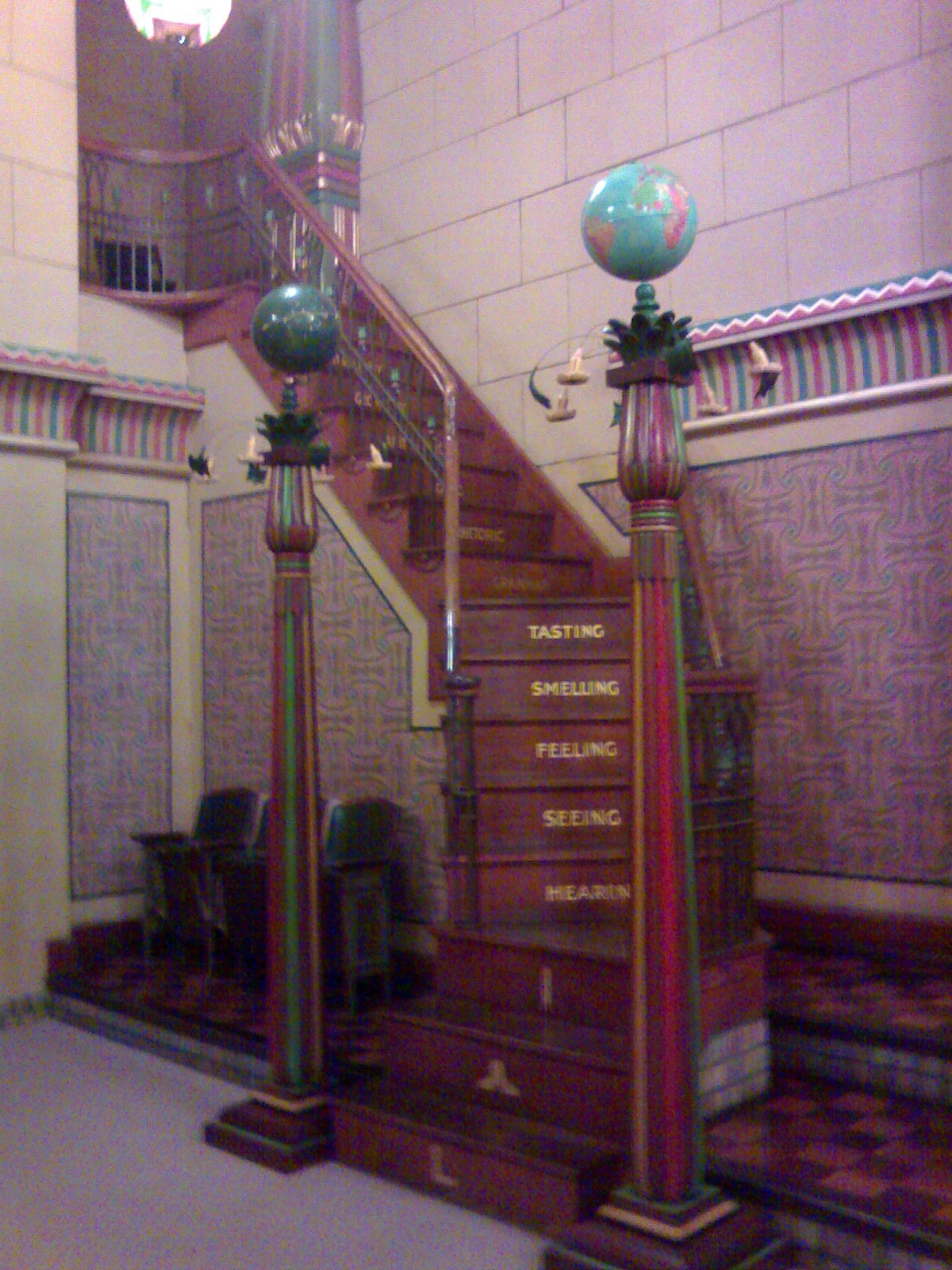
Salt Lake Masonic Temple Lodge Room Decoration, December 2007

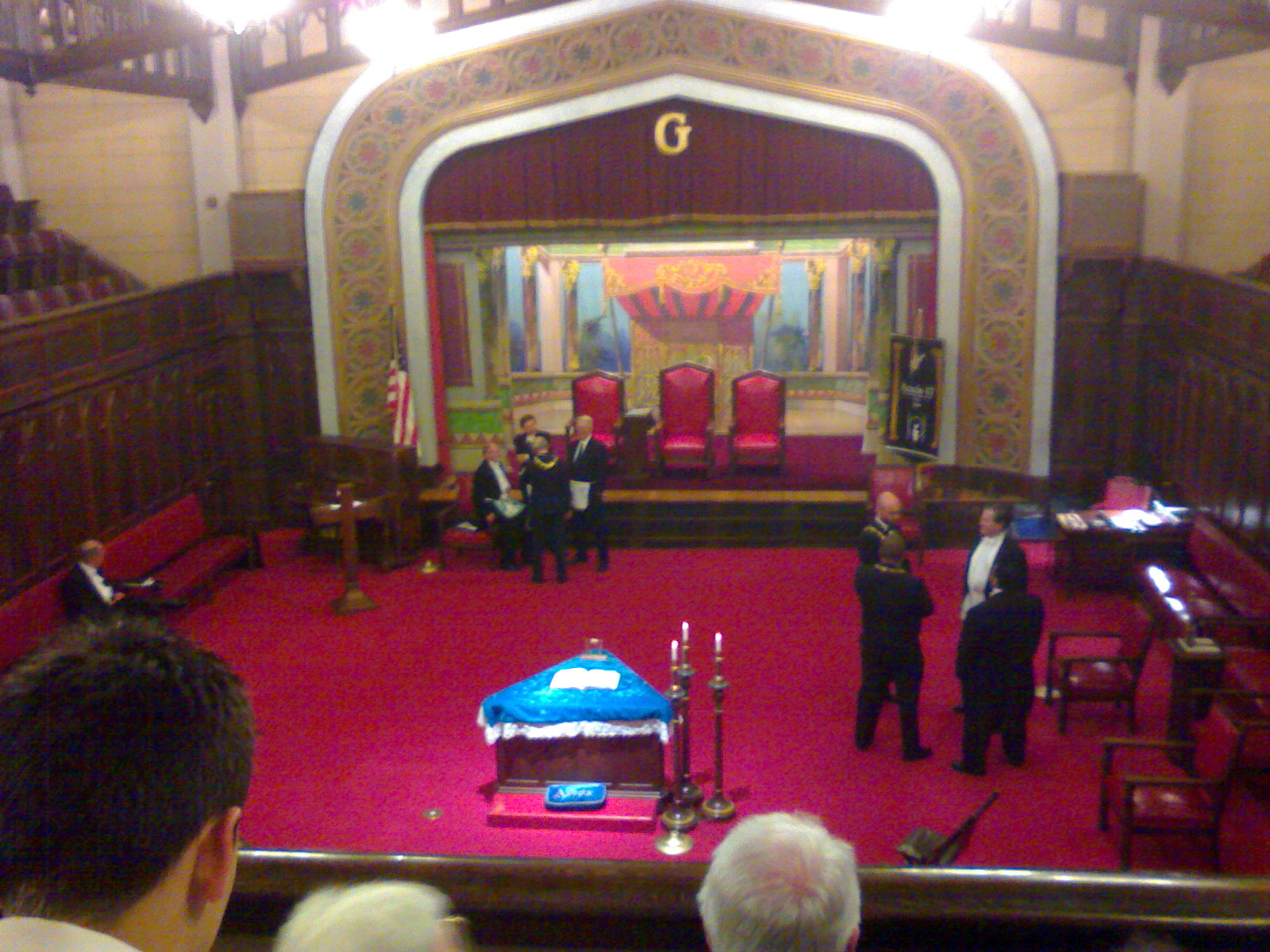
Gothic Room at Salt Lake Masonic Temple, December 2007

Light is perhaps the most significant symbol of Freemasonry, and the architect incorporated many Egyptian references to Light into the design of the Temple. Allusions to the Egyptian god Horus (then considered by Egyptologists to be a god of Light) occupy much of the building, including the cornice at the main entrance. There are three entrances to the Temple, alluding to the three Lights of a Masonic Lodge. The main entrance from the north of the building; as the north is deemed a place of darkness in Masonic ritual, hence those coming through the front door are traveling toward light.

The funerary ramp located west of the main entrance is surmounted by a scarab, the Egyptian symbol of resurrection and immortality, and together with the seven acacia flanking the ramp allude to Masonic belief in a Supreme Being and the immortality of the soul.

The main entrance is approached by a staircase of three flights respectively consisting of three, five, seven and nine steps. The staircase is flanked by two sphinxes. Each sphinx holds a single sphere, one celestial, one terrestrial, and each is arranged to contemplate its sphere.

== See also ==
- National Register of Historic Places listings in Salt Lake City
