= First Presbyterian Church of Salt Lake City =

Historic church in Salt Lake City, Utah, U.S.

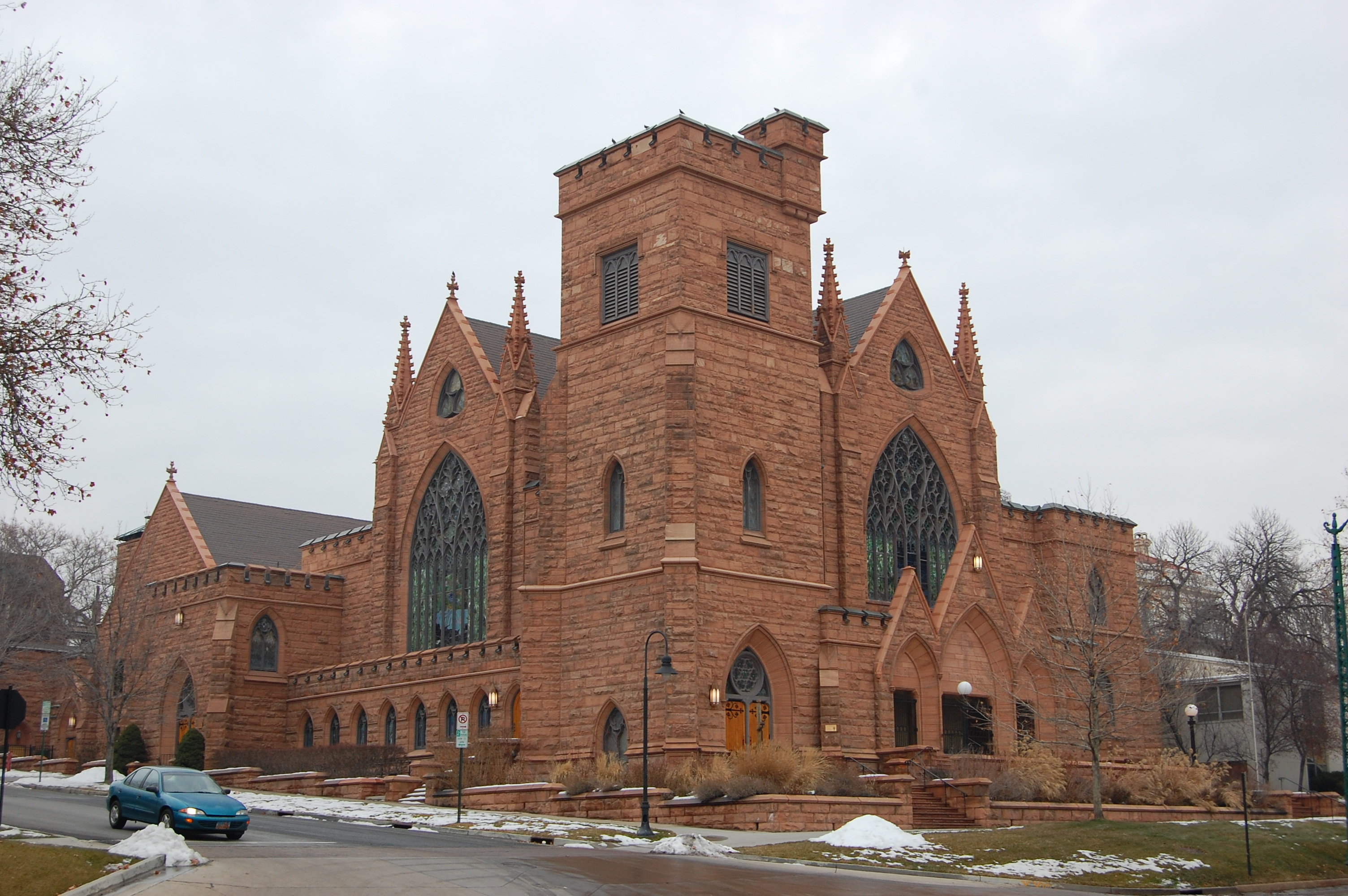
- First Presbyterian Church of Salt Lake City
- 40.769756°N 111.880230°W
- Location: 371 E. South Temple, Salt Lake City, Utah
- Country: United States
- Denomination: Presbyterian
- Website: fpcslc.org

History
- Founded: 1873

Architecture
- Architect: Walter E. Ware
- Architectural type: Gothic Revival
- Years built: 1903
- Completed: 1905

The First Presbyterian Church of Salt Lake City is a Presbyterian Church congregation in Salt Lake City, Utah. It was founded in 1871. From 1874-1905 the church met in a building at the corner of Second South and Second East, which has since been demolished. The current red sandstone building was constructed from 1903-1905.

The current church building is in the Gothic Revival style and was designed by architect Walter E. Ware. The design was patterned after Carlisle Cathedral in Carlisle, England. The exterior was built of red sandstone quarried from Red Butte Canyon. The stained glass windows were created by R. T. Giles and Co. of Minneapolis, Minnesota. The original organ was built by the Bennett Organ Company of Rock Island, IL and dedicated in a 1911 concert featuring renowned organist Clarence Eddy.

The current building was first occupied in 1905, the congregation substantially enlarged, renovated, and modernized it in 1956. It was listed on the National Register of Historic Places in 1980. It is also Entry No. 323 on the American Presbyterian/Reformed Historic Sites Registry. It was listed on the National Register of Historic Places in 1982 as a contributing building in the South Temple Historic District.

In 1875, Professor John M. Coyner founded The Collegiate Institute, a college preparatory program which met in the basement of the old church building at Second South and Second East. The institute later grew to become Westminster College.
