= Oregon Shortline Railroad Company Building =

Historic building in Salt Lake City, Utah, U.S.

- U.S. National Register of Historic Places
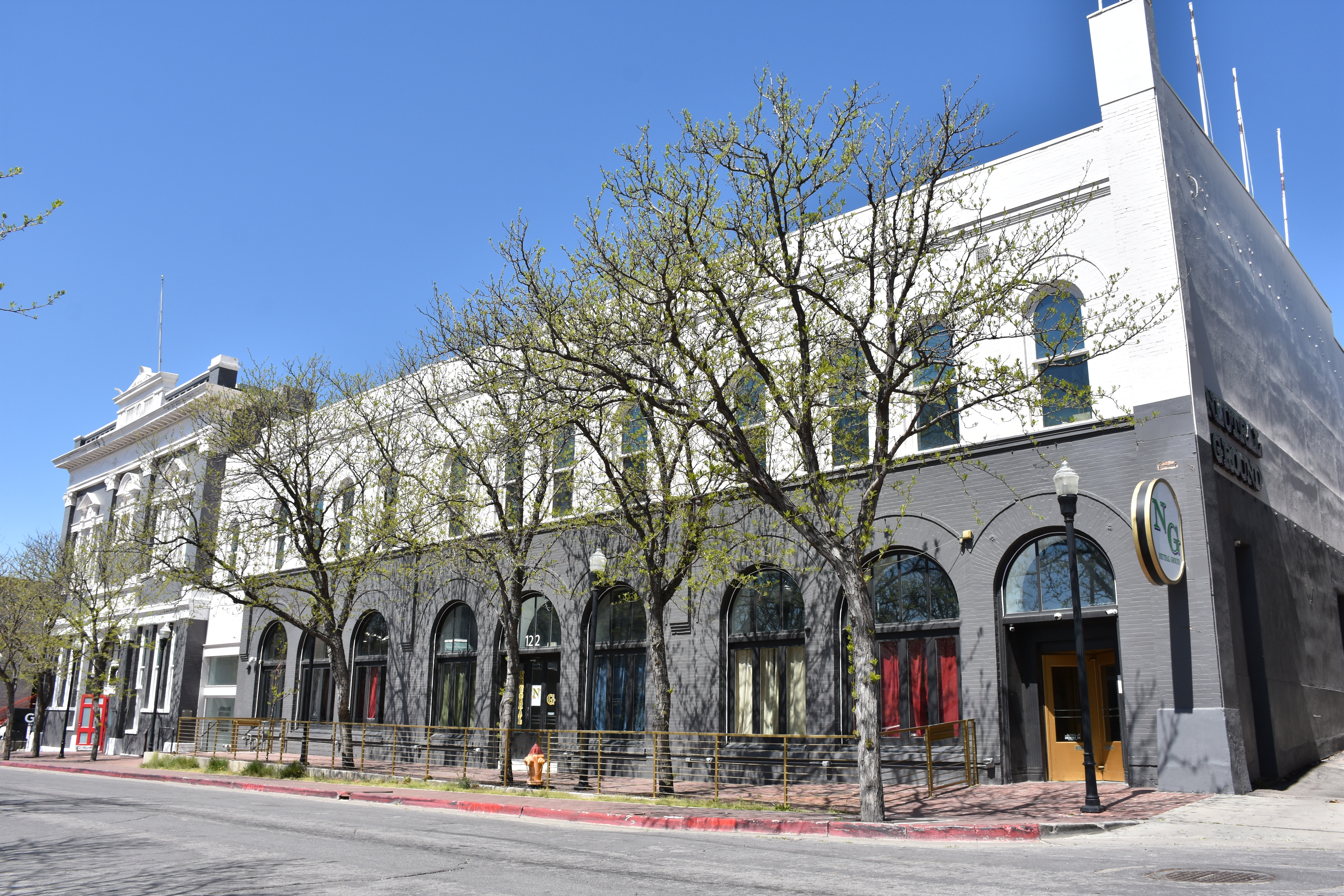

- Location within Utah Location within the United States
- Location: 126–140 Pierpont Ave., Salt Lake City, Utah
- Coordinates: 40°45′51″N 111°53′39″W
- Area: less than one acre
- Built: 1897–98
- Architect: Carl M. Neuhausen
- Architectural style: Renaissance
- NRHP reference No.: 76001829
- Added to NRHP: June 23, 1976

The Oregon Shortline Railroad Company Building in Salt Lake City, Utah, was built in 1897–98. It was listed on the National Register of Historic Places in 1976.

It is a complex of three buildings, connected and all two-storied. The west-most one, at 134–142 Pierpont, once housed Salt Lake High School.

It was architect Carl M. Neuhausen's first major commission, and its success greatly propelled his career.
