= Enos Wall Mansion =

Residential building in Salt Lake City, Utah, U.S.

- U.S. Historic district – Contributing property
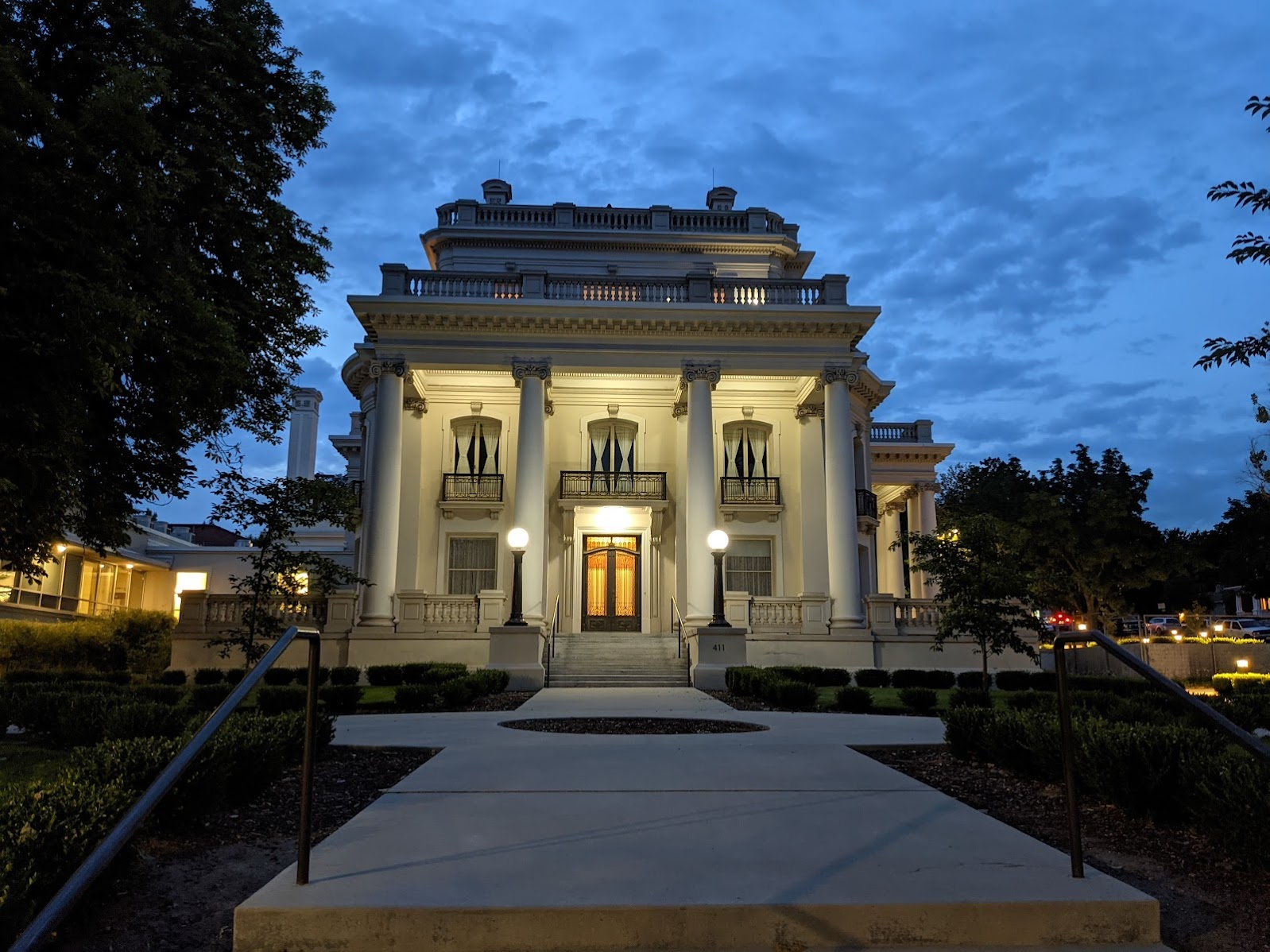

- Location within Utah Location within the United States
- Location: 411 East South Temple, Salt Lake City, Utah
- Coordinates: 40.769928°N 111.879610°W
- Built: 1880
- Architect: Richard K.A. Kletting
- Architectural style: Classical Revival
- Part of: South Temple Historic District (ID82004147)
- Designated CP: July 14, 1982

The Enos Wall Mansion, at 411 East South Temple, in Salt Lake City, Utah, was built in 1905. It was designed by Richard K.A. Kletting. It was listed on the National Register of Historic Places as a contributing building in the South Temple Historic District.

It serves as the Thomas S. Monson Center of the University of Utah. Previously it was the home of Ensign College from 1962 to 2006.
