= Newspaper Agency Corporation =

Printing and advertising company in Utah, United States

The Newspaper Agency Corporation Inc. (or NAC or NACorp) is a printing, delivery, and advertising company. It is jointly owned by the Deseret Morning News and The Salt Lake Tribune, the two major daily newspapers in Salt Lake City, Utah.

In 1948, the long-time rivals, the Deseret News and The Salt Lake Tribune, along with several other newspapers in the country, were experiencing financial troubles. The Deseret News had begun an aggressive plan to win new subscribers, including improving content and offering prizes to new readers but had been floundering for years. The Salt Lake Tribune controlled market share but still felt economic pressure. Rising printing costs also contributed to the decline.

In 1952, the two papers worked out a 30-year agreement, known as the Joint Operating Agreement (JOA). It founded the NAC and combined the expenses of press advertising, circulation, and mechanical departments but still maintained separate newsrooms. Longtime Tribune publisher John F. Fitzpatrick was the architect of the NAC. He approached his friend and LDS President David O. McKay with the idea. Fitzpatrick's brainchild, the JOA would ensure the continuation of the News and still keep the dominant position of the Tribune in the state. Without the agreement the News may have fallen into ruin after a failed subscription promotional effort. The agreement also allowed the Tribune to sell its lackluster afternoon paper, the Salt Lake Telegram, to the News, which was then an evening paper. The Telegram promptly ceased publication.

There was much early confusion. Many people confused joint presses with joint newsrooms, and in 1952, the Deseret News stopped printing a Sunday edition. News subscribers would receive a Sunday copy of the Tribune instead.

The NAC was the subject of congressional antitrust investigations during the 1960s, but in 1970, US President Richard Nixon signed the Newspaper Preservation Act, protecting the NAC.

The JOA was renewed in 1982 after negotiations between publishers Wendell J. Ashton of the Deseret News and John W. Gallivan of The Salt Lake Tribune allowed the Deseret News to print a Sunday paper again. The new agreement was in effect until 2012.

In a move thought to be an embrace of the "convergence" of newspaper, radio, television and the Internet, NAC is planning to change its name to "Media One" and to rid itself of the notion that it is dedicated to the production only of newspapers. However the confusion carried from NAC still exists with most advertisers and subscribers alike.
