= The Salt Lake Tribune =

Weekly newspaper in Salt Lake City, Utah

- The July 27, 2005, front page of The Salt Lake Tribune
- Type: Daily newspaper (1870–2020); Weekly newspaper (after 2020)
- Format: Broadsheet
- Owner(s): The Salt Lake Tribune, Inc. (a non-profit corporation)
- Editor: Lauren Gustus (executive editor)
- Founded: 1870 (as the Mormon Tribune)
- Headquarters: 48 West Market St. Suite 200; Salt Lake City, Utah 84101; US
- Circulation: 32,000 Digital Subscribers
- ISSN: 0746-3502
- Website: sltrib.com

The Salt Lake Tribune is a newspaper published in the city of Salt Lake City, Utah. The Tribune is owned by The Salt Lake Tribune, Inc., a nonprofit corporation. The newspaper's motto is "Utah's Independent Voice Since 1871."

== History ==
=== 19th century ===
A successor to Utah Magazine (1868), The Salt Lake Tribune was founded as the Mormon Tribune by a group of businessmen led by former members of the Church of Jesus Christ of Latter-day Saints (LDS Church) William Godbe, Elias L.T. Harrison and Edward Tullidge, who disagreed with the church's economic and political positions. After a year, the publishers changed the name to the Salt Lake Daily Tribune and Utah Mining Gazette, but soon after that, they shortened it to The Salt Lake Tribune.

Three Kansas businessmen, Frederic Lockley, George F. Prescott and A.M. Hamilton, purchased the company in 1873 and turned it into an independent newspaper which consistently backed the local Liberal Party. Sometimes vitriolic, the Tribune wrote disparagingly about LDS Church president Brigham Young. In the edition announcing Young's death, the Tribune wrote:

He was illiterate and he has made frequent boast that he never saw the inside of a school house. His habit of mind was singularly illogical and his public addresses the greatest farrago of nonsense that ever was put in print. He prided himself on being a great financer, and yet all of his commercial speculations have been conspicuous failures. He was hierophant, and pretended to be in daily [communion] with the Almighty, and yet he was groveling in his ideas, and the system of religion he formulated was well nigh Satanic.

=== 20th century ===
In 1901, newly elected United States senator Thomas Kearns, a Roman Catholic, and his business partner, David Keith, secretly bought the Tribune. After Keith died in 1918, the Kearns family bought out Keith's share of the Salt Lake Tribune Publishing Company. Eventually, the parent company became Kearns-Tribune Corporation.

The company began an evening edition in 1902, known as The Salt Lake Telegram. The Telegram was sold in 1914 and reacquired by the Tribune in 1930. It was phased out when the joint operating agreement was formed with the afternoon Deseret News, Salt Lake's daily newspaper owned by the LDS Church, in 1952.

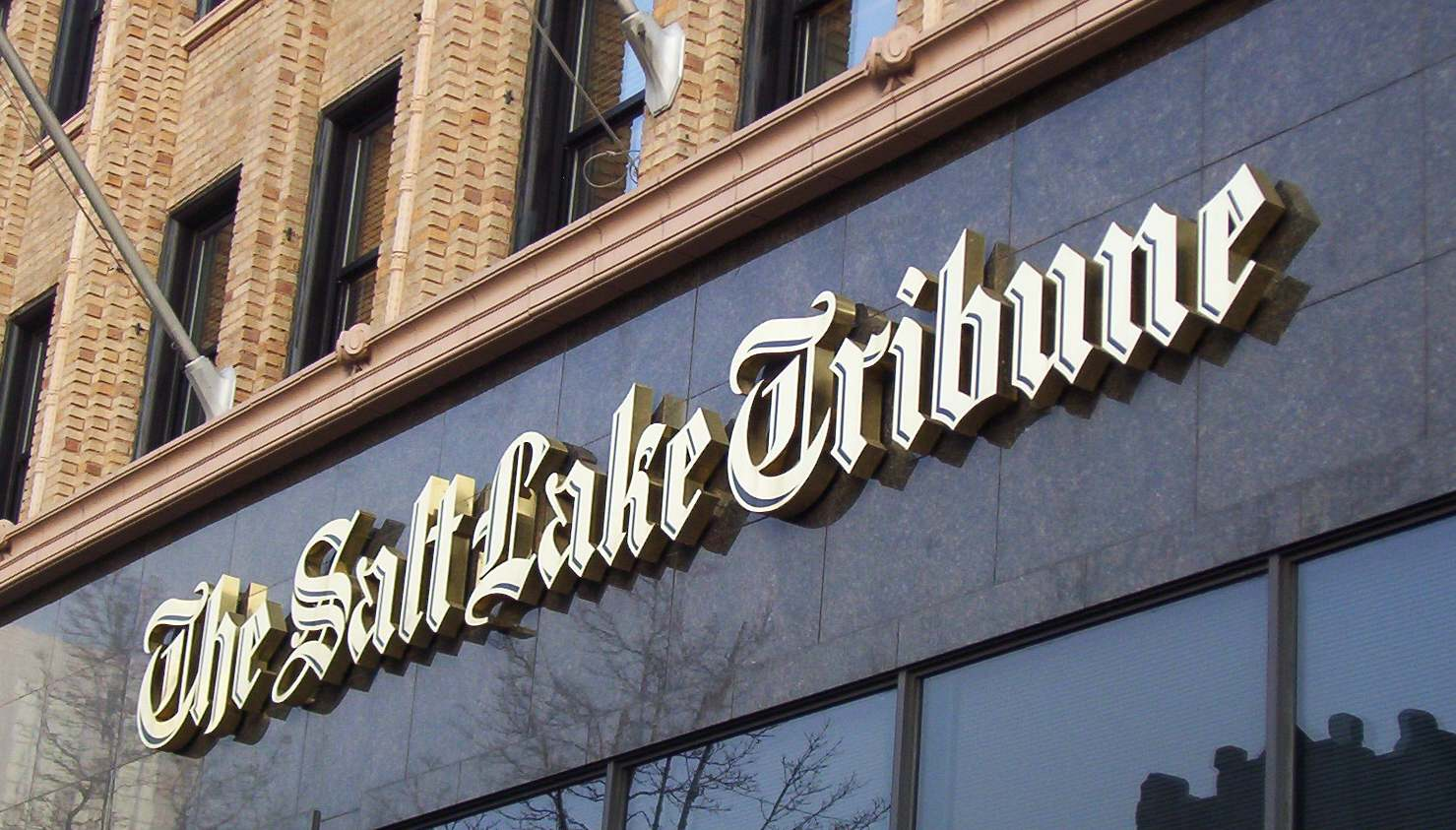
Marquee of The Salt Lake Tribune on the Tribune Building in Downtown Salt Lake City

John F. Fitzpatrick became publisher in 1924, ushering in what became seven decades of peaceful coexistence with the dominant LDS Church. In 1952 theTribune entered into a joint operating agreement with the Deseret News and created the Newspaper Agency Corporation. Fitzpatrick was the architect of NAC at the request of LDS Church President David O. McKay whose newspaper was near bankruptcy at the time. Fitzpatrick died of a heart attack in 1960, and was succeeded by John W. Gallivan, who had been trained as the next publisher from the time he joined the Tribune in 1937. Gallivan often joked with aspiring journalism students, telling them the best way to the publisher's desk was to get yourself left on the doorstep of the owner. (He had been orphaned at the age of five, then taken in by his mother's half-sister, Mrs. Thomas Kearns.) In the late 1950s, in spite of reluctance from John Fitzpatrick about the future of television, Gallivan joined a measured Tribune investment with The Standard Corporation in Ogden, Utah, to build one of the first microwave and cable TV systems across northern Nevada. On weekends, Gallivan traveled by bus to Elko, Nevada, to oversee the construction beginnings. Gallivan and Denver cable investor Bob Magness merged their companies into Tele-Communications Inc. (TCI) which eventually became the largest cable television company in the world. The Tribune's ownership interest in TCI reached nearly 15%, which played a large role in later mergers between the two companies. Gallivan remained as Tribune publisher until 1984, and chairman of the board until 1997.

For almost 100 years, it was a family-owned newspaper held by the heirs of U.S. Senator Thomas Kearns. After Kearns died in 1918, the company was controlled by his widow, Jennie Judge Kearns, and then the newspaper's longtime publisher was John F. Fitzpatrick, who started his career as secretary to Senator Kearns in 1913 and remained publisher until his death in 1960. John W. Gallivan, nephew of Mrs. Kearns, joined the Tribune in 1937 and succeeded Fitzpatrick as publisher in 1960, remaining as chairman until the merger with TCI, Inc. in 1997. The Kearns family owned a majority share of the newspaper until 1997, when the company merged with TCI in an effort to minimize inheritance tax liabilities borne by the two largest shareholders in the Kearns family. A buy-back agreement was put in place, providing for the Kearns family to reacquire The Tribune, after the IRS required a five-year holding period. However, in the interim TCI was merged with AT&T Corporation. After intense pressure from the LDS Church, and intense counter-suits from the Kearns family, the Tribune was subsequently sold by AT&T to Denver, Colorado-based MediaNews Group in 2000.

=== 21st century ===
In 2000, the Tribune published a 3-part series on the Mountain Meadows Massacre, after a backhoe operator accidentally dug up previously-unknown remains while working on the 1999 Mountain Meadows Monument. The LDS Church's displeasure at the articles' embarrassing disclosures has been alleged as motivation for its 2013 alleged attempt to silence the Tribune.

In 2002, the Tribune became mired in controversy after employees sold information related to the Elizabeth Smart kidnapping case to The National Enquirer. Tribune editor James "Jay" Shelledy resigned from his job at the paper amid the fallout of the scandal. Two staffers were also removed from their positions as Tribune reporters.

In 2004 the paper decided to move from its historic location at the downtown Tribune building to The Gateway development. Many people, including several Tribune employees, opposed the move, stating that it would harm the economy of Salt Lake's downtown. The move was completed in May 2005 and Tribune employees were told by editor Nancy Conway, "It is just a building."

==== Bankruptcy and alleged attempt to silence ====
After emerging from bankruptcy in 2010, MediaNews Group lost control of its ownership to a hedge fund, Alden Global Capital. "The remainder of the Denver-based chain is owned by a consortium of lenders and by Singleton himself."

In 2013, rumors swirled of renegotiations to the 1952 Joint Operating Agreement with the Deseret News, which may have put the Salt Lake Tribune at a marked financial disadvantage, potentially eventually bankrupting the Tribune. An anonymous note, delivered in disguised handwriting to Tribune offices in October, alleged that the LDS Church was secretly negotiating with Alden for this aim. Interested parties and local citizens' activist groups subsequently organized, petitioned the US Department of Justice to become involved, and eventually filed a lawsuit alleging anti-trust violations. Critics of the church assert that the efforts to target the Tribune were done with the participation of the church's First Presidency, its highest leadership body.

==== Huntsman ownership ====
On April 20, 2016, Huntsman Family Investments, LLC, a private equity firm controlled by Paul Huntsman, bought The Salt Lake Tribune. Paul Huntsman is the son of industrialist Jon Huntsman Sr. who is chairman of the holding company, and brother of former Utah governor and ambassador to China and later Russia Jon Huntsman Jr.

In 2017, the Tribune was awarded the Pulitzer Prize for Local Reporting for "a string of vivid reports revealing the perverse, punitive and cruel treatment given to sexual assault victims at Brigham Young University, one of Utah's most powerful institutions." The team included lead reporter Erin Alberty, managing editor Sheila R. McCann, reporters Jessica Miller and Alex Stuckey and editor-writer Rachel Piper. The winning package also included an investigation into multiple reports that Utah State University did not properly investigate.

In May 2018, the Tribune laid off over 38% of its newsroom staff, reducing headcount from 90 to 56. This was the fourth round of layoffs since 2011, and the first under the leadership of owner and publisher Paul Huntsman. The reason given was lower revenue due to decreased circulation and lower profit from online advertisements. Huntsman said that in the two years since he bought the newspaper, advertising revenues had declined 40%.

==== Conversion to nonprofit ====
In November 2019 the newspaper won approval from the Internal Revenue Service to become a 501(c)(3) non-profit. It was the first major (and first daily) U.S. newspaper to become a nonprofit.

In October 2020, the newspaper announced it would cease daily print publication at the end of the year, shifting instead to a weekly print product while maintaining a robust online presence. At the time, the paper had approximately 36,000 subscribers, a decline from a daily circulation of close to 200,000. Also in 2020, the Tribune ended its joint partnership with the Deseret News, which had lasted for 68 years.

From 2020 to 2021, the Tribune newsroom staff increased by 23%, with 33 reporters on staff in November 2021. The newly nonprofit paper also developed a variety of new projects. In 2023, the Tribune accepted the donation of The Times-Independent in Moab.

In July 2024, newsroom employees announced their intentions to unionize with the Denver Newspaper Guild and Communications Workers of America. The bargaining unit would represent 31 employees. In November 2026, The Sanpete Messenger was donated to the Tribune.

== Endorsements ==
In presidential elections, The Salt Lake Tribune endorsed George W. Bush in 2004; Barack Obama in 2008 and 2012; and Hillary Clinton in 2016. The paper discontinued making endorsements for all offices (local, state, and national) in 2019 upon becoming a non-profit corporation as IRS rules forbid endorsements of candidates by 501(c)(3) non-profits.

== See also ==
- Category:The Salt Lake Tribune people
- Pat Bagley - Editorial cartoonist for the Tribune
- Derks Field - minor league baseball park for the Salt Lake Bees named after Tribune sports editor John C. Derks (1873–1944)
- Peggy Fletcher Stack – religion reporter for The Salt Lake Tribune
- Frank Hewlett - Washington bureau chief
- Robert Kirby – humor columnist for The Salt Lake Tribune
- Tom C. Korologos - Politician who began career at Tribune
- Florabel Muir - first female reporter for Tribune
- Jennifer Napier-Pearce - Former executive editor of the Tribune
- William Nelson - Wisconsin politician who was editor of the Tribune
- Harold Schindler – historian, television screenwriter and editor for The Salt Lake Tribune
