= South Temple Historic District =

Historic district in Salt Lake City, Utah, U.S.

- U.S. National Register of Historic Places
- U.S. Historic district
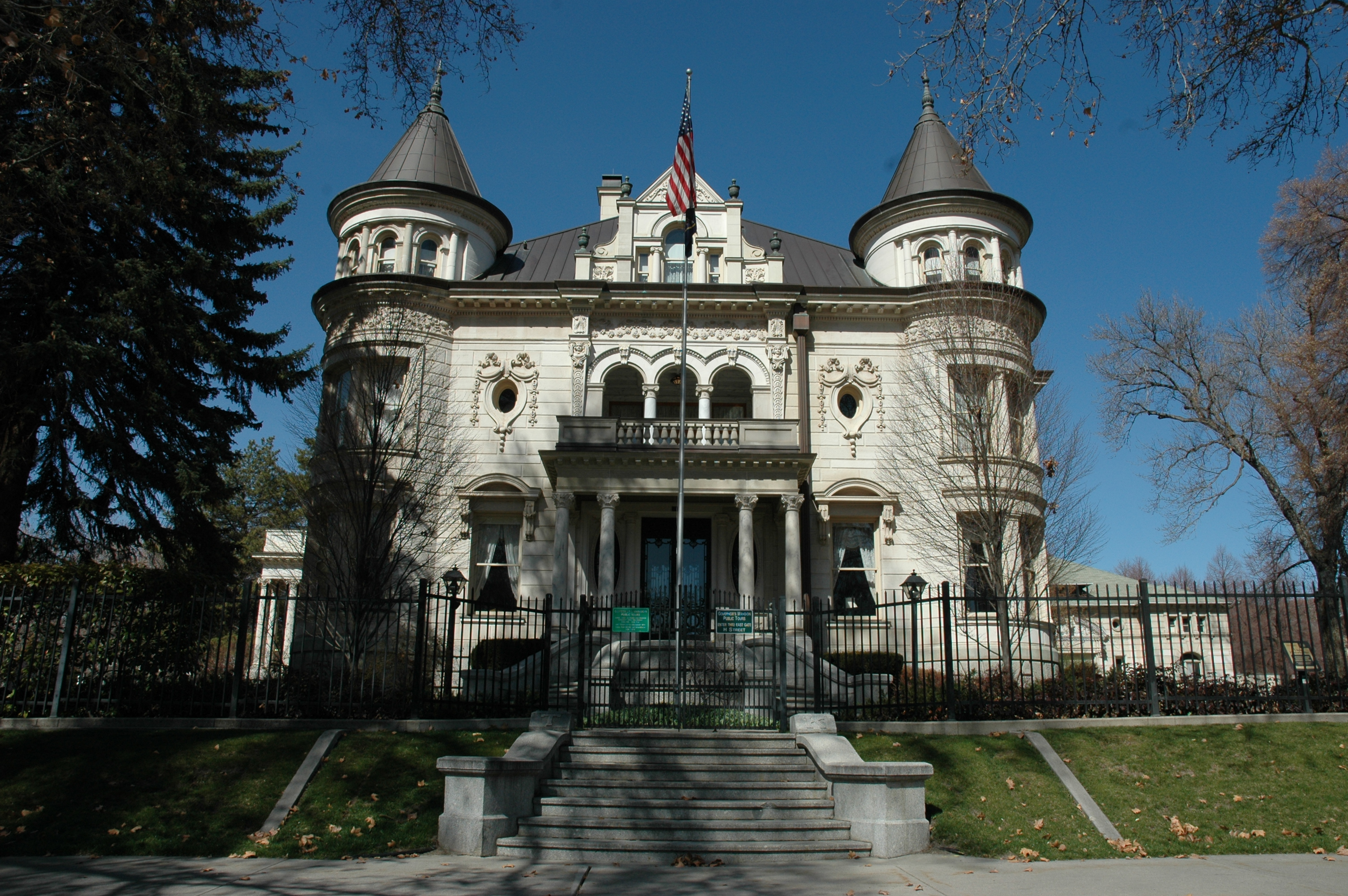
- The Governor's Mansion, a contributing building to the historic district

- Location within Utah Location within the United States
- Location: S. Temple St., Salt Lake City, Utah
- Coordinates: 40°46′10″N 111°52′11″W
- Area: 119 acres (48 ha)
- Built: 1880
- Architect: Multiple
- Architectural style: Mixed (more than 2 styles from different periods)
- NRHP reference No.: 82004147
- Added to NRHP: July 14, 1982

The South Temple Historic District is a 119-acre (48 ha) historic district that was the first to be listed in the Salt Lake City Register in 1976, and was listed on the National Register of Historic Places in 1982.

It includes 106 contributing buildings, including the Governor's Mansion and the Salt Lake Masonic Temple.

It includes:

- Enos Wall Mansion, Classical Revival, designed by Richard K.A. Kletting
- Emanuel Kahn House, Queen Anne, separately-NRHP-listed
- Cathedral of the Madeleine, 319 East South Temple, Victorian Romanesque, designed by C.M. Neuhausen
- Kearns Mansion, Chateauesque, designed by Carl M. Neuhausen
- Gothic Revival: First Presbyterian Church Walter E. Ware
- Keith-Brown Mansion, Frederick A. Hale
- Shingle Style: Markland House, Frederick A. Hale
- Renaissance Revival: Alta Club, Fred A. Hale
- Prairie Style: Ladies Literary Club, Ware and Treganza
- Egyptian Revival: Masonic Temple, Scott and Welch
- Colonial Revival: Terry House, Henry Ives Cobb
