= Carl M. Neuhausen =

American architect

Carl Martel Neuhausen (October 8, 1858 – September 22, 1907) was an American architect based in Salt Lake City, Utah. He designed a number of buildings that survive and are listed on the U.S. National Register of Historic Places.

He was born in 1858 in Stuttgart, Germany. He has been asserted have been "the only prominent Utah architect to employ the Renaissance spirit and mannerist detailing of the Chateauesque style." He worked for a time with architect Richard K.A. Kletting and then split off to work on his own in 1895. He designed several large buildings in Salt Lake City including the Kearns Mansion and the Cathedral of the Madeleine.

His first major independent work was the Oregon Shortline Railroad Company Building.

He designed his home, the NRHP-listed Carl M. Neuhausen House in Salt Lake City, Utah, in Chateauesque style; it was permitted to be built in 1901. Neuhausen died in the house in 1907 of heart failure, at age 49.

He had 8 children, 4 boys and 4 girls.

== Images of selected works ==
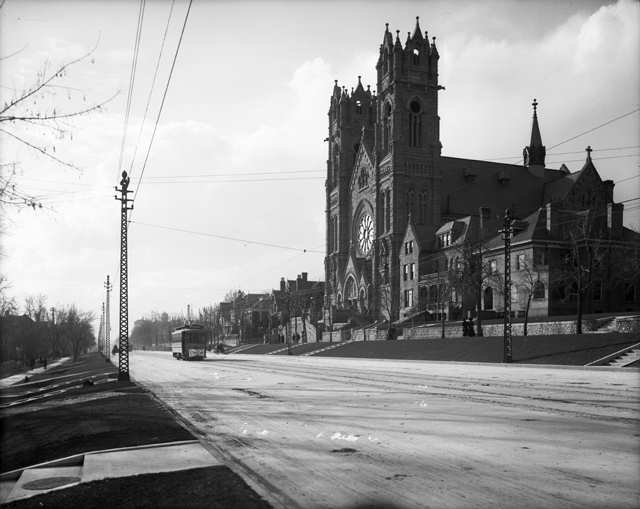
Cathedral of the Madeleine, in 1908

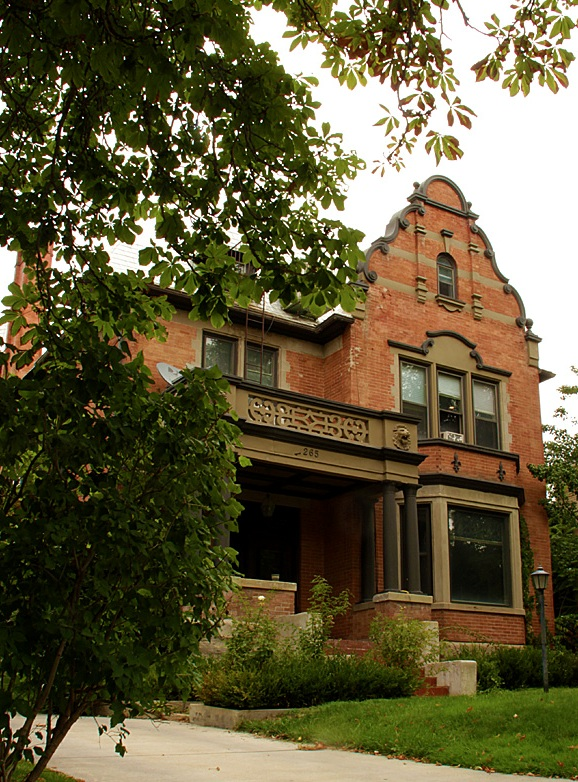
Carl M. Neuhausen House

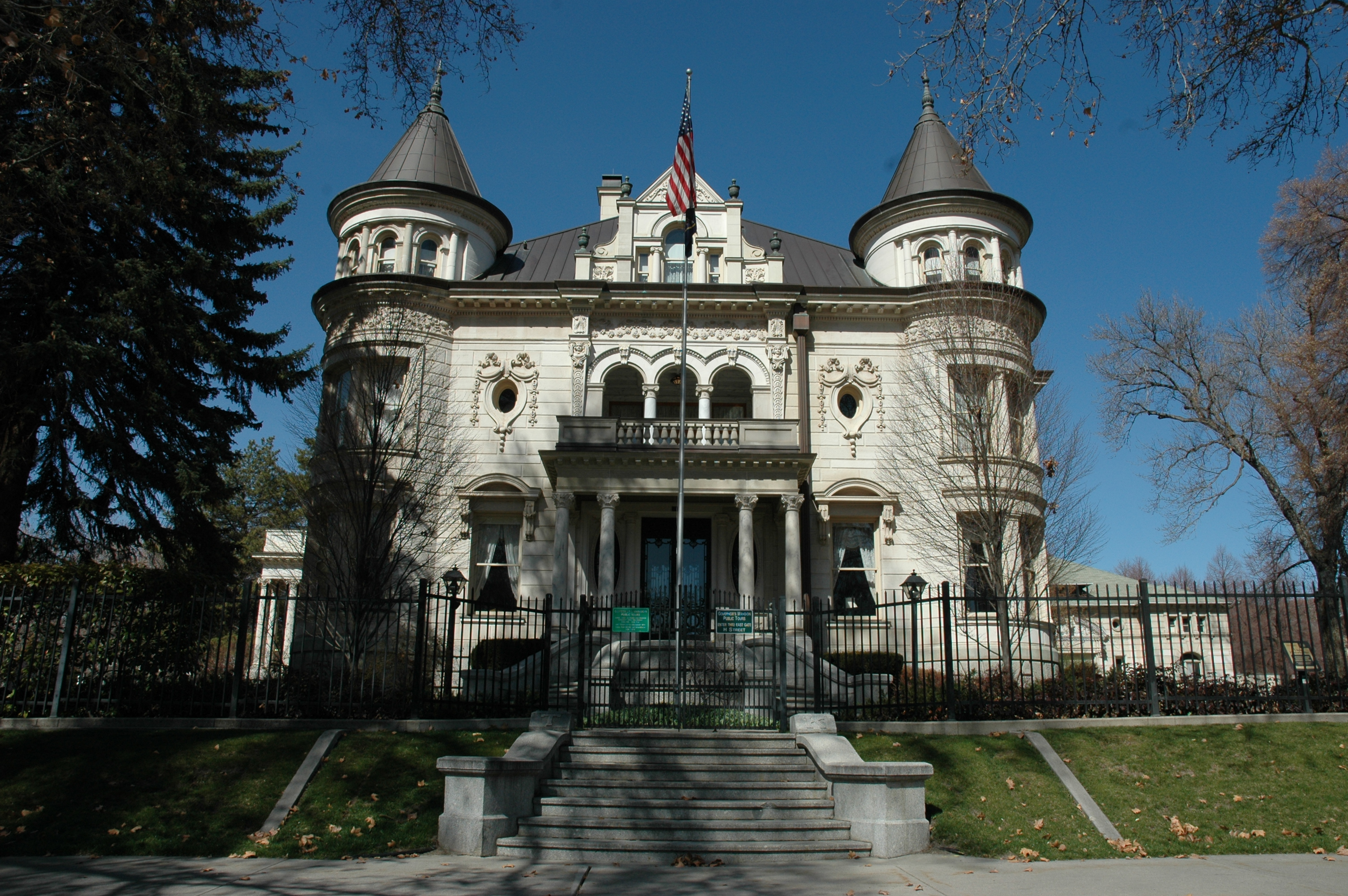
Thomas Kearns Mansion and Carriage House

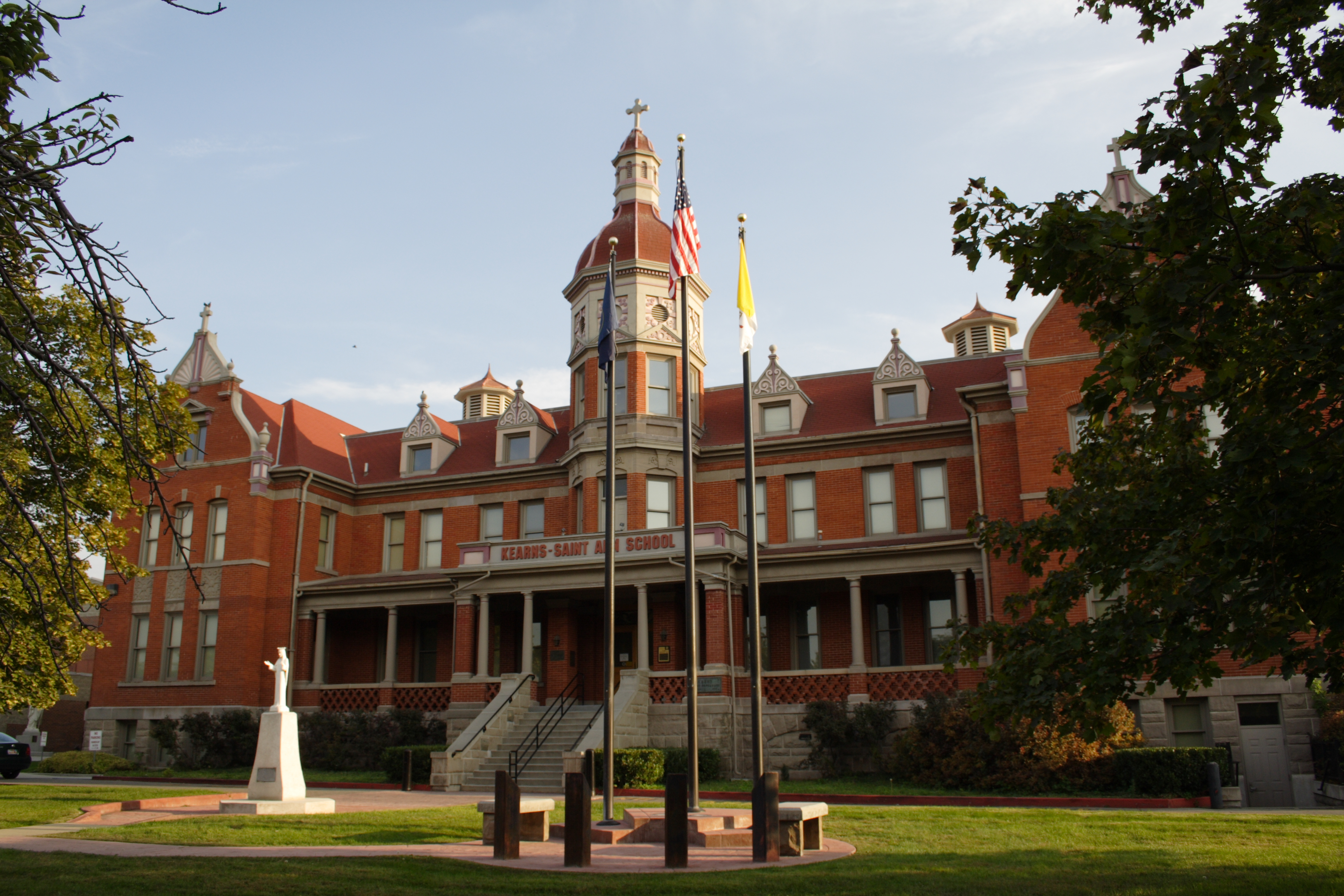
Kearns-St. Ann's Orphanage

== Works ==
Works include:

- Kearns-St. Ann's Orphanage (1890), 430 E. 2100 South, Salt Lake City, Utah, NRHP-listed
- Oregon Shortline Railroad Company Building (1897–98), 126-140 Pierpont Ave., Salt Lake City, NRHP-listed
- Cathedral of the Madeleine (1900–09), 331 E. South Temple St., Salt Lake City, (Neuhausen, C.M.; Mecklenburg, Bernard), NRHP-listed
- Thomas Kearns Mansion and Carriage House (1900–02), 603 E. South Temple St., Salt Lake City, NRHP-listed
- Carl M. Neuhausen House (1901), 1265 E. 100 South, Salt Lake City, NRHP-listed
- Congregation Montefiore (1903), 355 S. 300 East, Salt Lake City, NRHP-listed
