= Thomas Kearns =

American politician (1862–1918)

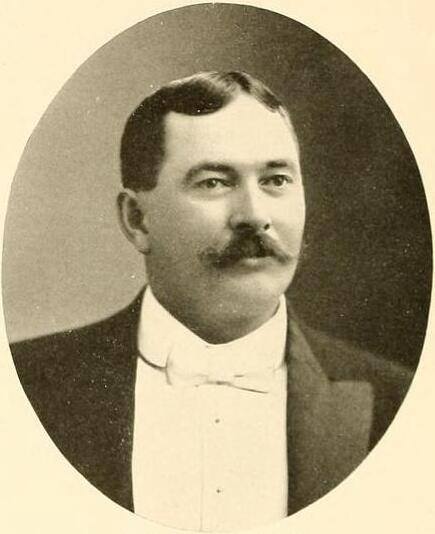
- Kearns in a 1903 publication

United States Senator from Utah
- In office January 23, 1901 – March 3, 1905
- Preceded by: Frank J. Cannon
- Succeeded by: George Sutherland

Personal details
- Born: April 11, 1862 Woodstock, Canada West (now Ontario)
- Died: October 18, 1918 (aged 56) Salt Lake City, Utah, United States
- Party: Republican
- Spouse: Jennie J. Judge (m. 1890)
- Children: 4

Thomas Kearns (April 11, 1862 – October 18, 1918) was an American mining, banking, railroad, and newspaper magnate. He was a U.S. Senator from Utah from 1901 to 1905. Unlike the predominantly Latter-day Saint constituents of his state, Senator Kearns was Catholic.

== Early life ==
Thomas Kearns was born on April 11, 1862, near Woodstock, [Canada West (now Ontario), to Margaret (née Maher) and Thomas Kearns. He attended public schools there until he moved with his parents to O'Neill in Holt County, Nebraska. He attended the public schools until he was 17, worked on his family farm, and engaged in the freighting business.

== Mining ==
Kearns moved to Salt Lake City and later Park City, Utah, in 1883. He worked in mining, prospected, and operated several mines. He worked in the Ontario mine and became part owner of the Mayflower mine in 1889. In 1889 and his partner David Keith discovered the rich ore that became the famous Silver King Mine in Park City. They would eventually own several mines throughout Utah, Nevada, Colorado and California. In Park City, Kearns, a Catholic, married Jennie J. Judge, daughter of Sarah J. and Patrick Judge, on September 15, 1890, in Salt Lake City. They had four children: Margaret Ann (1892–1893), Edmund Judge (1893–1936), Thomas Francis (1897–1967), and Helen Marie (1899–1943).

== Politics ==
Kearns served in the City Council of Park City in 1895. He was a member of the Utah constitutional convention of 1895, where he worked for an eight-hour work day. He was a delegate to the 1896 and 1900 Republican National Conventions.

He was elected as a Republican to the U.S. Senate to fill the vacancy in the term commencing March 4, 1899. At the time, U.S. Senators were still selected by state legislatures. Utah's state legislators had already indicated they would not support the incumbent, Republican Frank J. Cannon, for reelection. Alfred W. McCune, one of Salt Lake City's most prominent businessmen, sought and won the backing of the Church of Jesus Christ of Latter-day Saints (LDS Church) in his bid for the seat. But the legislature quickly deadlocked over the election. One-hundred and twenty-one ballots were cast, and no winner emerged. On February 18, a state representative accused McCune of trying to buy his vote. A seven-member legislative voted 7-to-2 to absolve McCune of the charge, and although balloting resumed on March 8 McCune still lacked enough votes to win office (he had only 25 votes). The legislature adjourned without having chosen a senator.

In early 1901, the newly elected legislature elected Kearns. He served from January 23, 1901, to March 3, 1905. Kearns was the first Utahn to establish a national and international political reputation, partly because of his personal and political friendship with Presidents William McKinley, Theodore Roosevelt, and William Howard Taft. Through Kearns' efforts as Utah's U.S. Senator, Fort Douglas became a regimental post.

Supporters of Kearns formed the American Party. Though not publicly among the party's organizers, Kearns was influential in the party. The party was endorsed by the Salt Lake Tribune—which Kearns and his partner David Keith purchased in October 1901—and was successful in Utah politics from 1904 to 1911.

== Business and later life ==
After finishing his term in 1905, Kearns resumed his work in the mining, railroad, newspaper and banking businesses. Kearns and his partner David Keith purchased The Salt Lake Tribune newspaper in 1901 through a surrogate. He was one of the original incorporators of the San Pedro, Los Angeles & Salt Lake Railroad and helped to ensure its success in completion from Salt Lake City to Las Vegas and on to Los Angeles. He resided in Salt Lake City, Utah, until his death in 1918. He died of a stroke eight days after he was hit by a reckless driver on the corner of Main and South Temple.

Kearns and his wife, Jennie Judge Kearns, provided all the necessary funds to build the Kearns-Saint Ann's Orphanage, now Kearns-St. Ann's Catholic elementary school. They built a grand chateauesque marble, granite and sandstone palace residence on Brigham Street, now South Temple. Mrs. Kearns donated it to the state in 1937 to be used as the official Governor's residence; it is still being used as the Utah Governor's Mansion. He contributed to St. Mary's Cathedral in Salt Lake City.

== See also ==
- Kearns, Utah
- Kearns Building
- William Hood House
- List of United States senators born outside the United States

== Bibliography ==
- Alexander, Thomas G. Mormonism in Transition. Urbana, Ill.: University of Illinois Press, 1996.
- Appletons' Annual Cyclopaedia and Register of Important Events. New York: D. Appleton and Company, 1902.
- Committee on Privileges and Elections. In the Matter of the Protests Against the Right of Hon. Reed Smoot, A Senator From the State of Utah, to Hold His Seat. Doc. No. 486. 59th Cong, 1st Sess. Committee on Privileges and Elections. United States Senate. Washington, D.C.: U.S. Government Printing Office, 1906.
- Powell, Allan Kent. Utah History Encyclopedia. Salt Lake City: University of Utah Press, 1995.

U.S. Senate
Preceded by Frank J. Cannon	U.S. senator (Class 1) from Utah; 1901–1905; Served alongside: Joseph L. Rawlins, Reed Smoot	Succeeded by George Sutherland
