= Utah Governor's Mansion =

Historic building in Salt Lake City, Utah, U.S.

- Thomas Kearns Mansion and Carriage House
- U.S. National Register of Historic Places
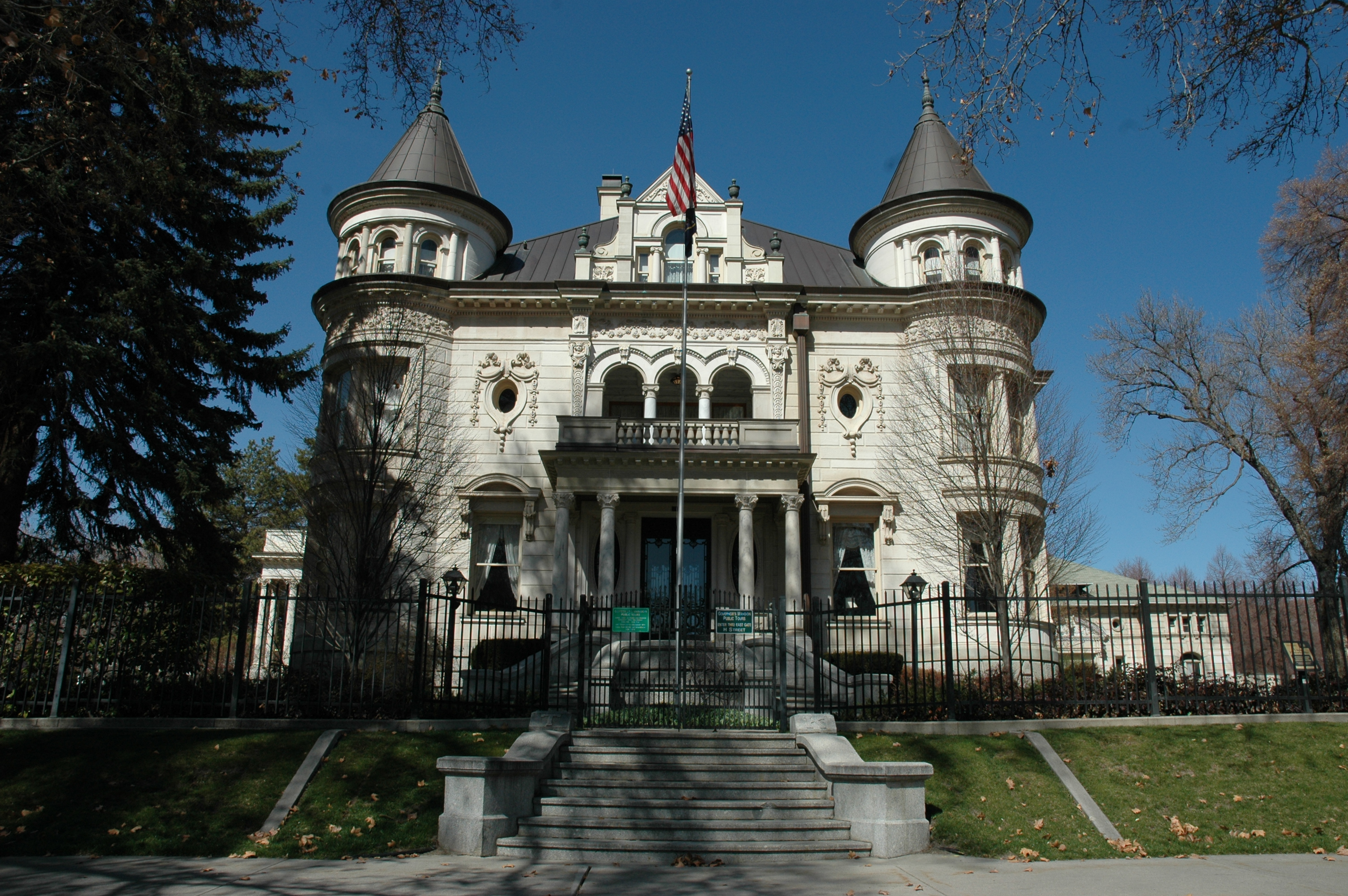
- Governor's Mansion, March 2010

- Location within Utah Location within the United States
- Interactive map showing the location of the Utah Governors’ Mansion
- Location: 603 East South Temple Street; Salt Lake City, Utah; United States
- Coordinates: 40°46′11″N 111°52′23″W
- Area: 9 acres (3.6 ha)
- Built: 1900-02
- Architect: Neuhausen, Carl M.
- NRHP reference No.: 70000631
- Added to NRHP: February 26, 1970

The Utah Governor's Mansion (also known as the Kearns Mansion) is the official residence of the governor of Utah and family. It is located at 603 East South Temple Street (within the South Temple Historic District) in Salt Lake City, Utah, United States.

== Description ==
Completed in 1902 for United States Senator and mining magnate Thomas Kearns, the house was designed by notable Utah architect Carl M. Neuhausen, who also designed the Cathedral of the Madeleine in Salt Lake City. The elegant home was built using the finest materials by the finest craftsmen available, resulting in a quality and style similar to that of Eastern mansions like those of the Vanderbilts and Carnegies. The mansion also served not only as a home and a place for the Senator to conduct official business, but also as a venue for entertainment where guests would dance and enjoy the music of live orchestras. During this period many political and religious dignitaries were guests in the Kearns mansion, including President Theodore Roosevelt, who was a personal friend of Senator Kearns.

== History ==
Senator Kearns died in 1918, and in February 1937, Jennie Judge Kearns donated the Kearns Mansion to the State of Utah. The mansion was donated with the condition that it serve as the Governor's Residence. For the next twenty years the governors of Utah used the mansion as their primary residence. From 1957 to 1977, the Utah Historical Society occupied the mansion as a library, museum, and office space. In 1977, Governor Scott Matheson proposed that the mansion be restored as a governor's residence and, after an extensive renovation, the mansion became a residence once again in 1980.

On December 15, 1993, a fire, caused by faulty wiring on the Christmas tree in the main hall, destroyed much of the mansion. Governor Mike Leavitt was not at home at the time, but First Lady Jackie Leavitt and her staff were quick to notify the Salt Lake City Fire Department, and their response kept the mansion from suffering more significant damage. A long and painstaking restoration was begun, to restore the mansion to its original state and salvage as much of the historical interior as possible.

The $7.8 million restoration brought the home back to its original 1902 style, while providing many current safety standards, such as a fire sprinkler system, new wiring and plumbing, new heating and cooling, a security system, and seismic upgrades.

The property is listed on the U.S. National Register of Historic Places as the Thomas Kearns Mansion and Carriage House. The listing includes both the mansion and the carriage house on the same 9-acre (3.6 ha) property.

== See also ==
- List of governors' residences in the United States
- South Temple Historic District
- National Register of Historic Places listings in Salt Lake City
