= Warehouse District (Salt Lake City) =

Historic district in Salt Lake City, Utah, U.S.

- U.S. National Register of Historic Places
- U.S. Historic district
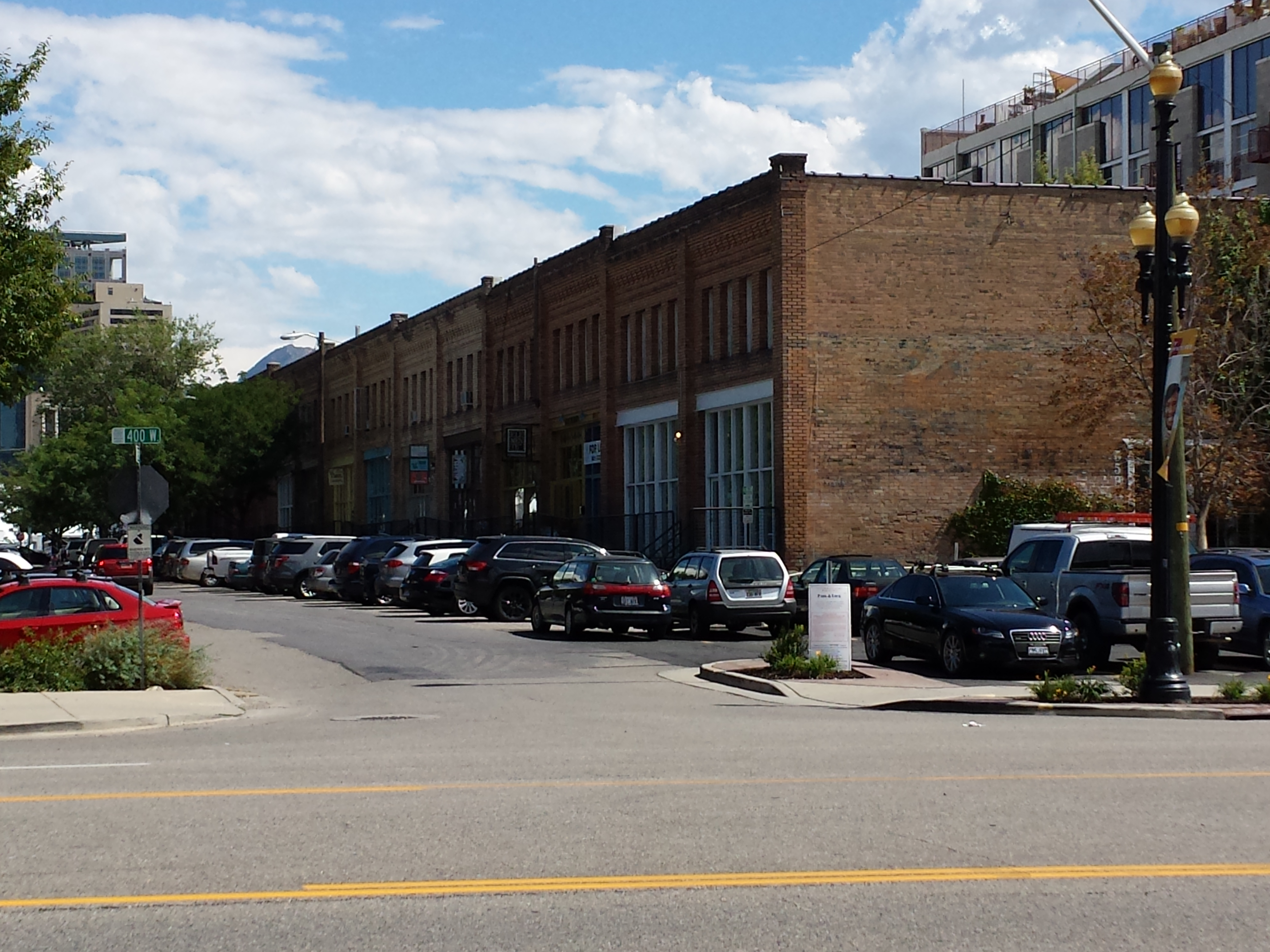

- Location within Utah Location within the United States
- Location: 200 South and Pierpont Ave. between 300 and 400 West, and roughly bounded by I-15, US 50 S., W. Temple St., 300 West & 1000 South, Salt Lake City, Utah
- Coordinates: 40°45′47″N 111°54′10″W
- Area: 13 acres (5.3 ha) (original); 544 acres (220 ha) (increased)
- Architect: Richard Kletting; Walter Ware; others
- Architectural style: Early Commercial
- MPS: Salt Lake City Business District MRA
- NRHP reference No.: 82004149 (original); 16000125 (increase)

Significant dates
- Added to NRHP: August 17, 1982; March 22, 2016 (increase)
- Boundary increase: March 22, 2016

The Warehouse District of Salt Lake City, Utah, is a historic district on the city's west side. The area has been occupied by artists, and worked on by developers. A small portion of its area was added to the National Register of Historic Places in 1982, and the listing was greatly enlarged by a boundary increase in 2016.

== Original district ==
"The original Warehouse District was listed on the National Register in 1982 and included 16 buildings with a somewhat undefined period of significance from approximately 1890 to 1927. The original district boundary encompasses a roughly 1-block area straddling 200 South between 300 West and 400 West in Salt Lake City. Of the 16 buildings in the original district, 15 were determined to be contributing resources..."

The 15 contributing buildings, along odd then even sides of W. 2nd South, and then on other streets, were:

1. Keyser Warehouse (1920), 312 W. 2nd South
2. Keyser Warehouse (1919), 320 W. 2nd South
3. Keyser Warehouse (1909), 328 W. 2nd South
4. Kahn Brothers grocery building (1900), 342 W. 2nd South
5. Salt Lake Stamp Co. (1923), 380 W. 2nd South
6. Crane Building (1910), 307 W. 2nd South
7. Symns Wholesale Grocery Co. (1892–93), 327-331 W. 2nd South
8. Jennings-Hanna Warehouse (1915), 353 W. 2nd South, brick and concrete, designed by Richard Kletting
9. Keyser Warehouse (c.1902), 357 S. 2nd South
10. Henderson Block (1897–98), 379 W. 2nd South, designed by Walter Ware, separately listed on the National Register in 1978
11. Cudahy Packing Co. (1918), 235 S. 400 West
12. Keyser Warehouse (c.1902), 346 Pierpont Ave.
13. Free Fanner's Market (1910), 333 Pierpont Ave.
14. Nelson-Ricks Creamery (1927), 314 W. 3rd South
15. Firestone Tire Co.(1925), 308 W. 3rd South

The one non-contributing intrusion was the Trucker's Cafe (c.1960), at 358 W. 2nd South. It was later demolished. (cite the expansion document)

The district was listed as part of a group of about 35 listings in 1982, as a result of a study of the historic resources in the larger business district area.

== Expanded district ==
The district was expanded by a boundary increase listing in 2016, at which time additional documentation was published. The district is now nearly a square mile in area (it is 544 acres vs. 640 acres in a square mile). It has an irregular shape, roughly bounded by I-15, 50 South, West Temple Street, 300 West, and 1000 South.

The expanded district listing was guided by the "Salt Lake City Business District MRA" document.

The district includes 26 properties which were already separately listed on the National Register, and a total of 197 contributing resources. Many are warehouses and commercial sites, but the district also includes residential properties. To qualify as a contributing resource, a site in the district need to have been constructed in 1869-1966 and to have sustained only minimal physical alteration.

Field studies in 2012 and 2015 identified four periods of development in the district:

- Railroads and Outside Influences 1869-1899 - 29 buildings, 20 contributing
- Commercialization and Immigration 1900-1928 - 102 buildings, 76 contributing
- Great Depression and World War II 1929-1945 - 31 buildings, 22 contributing
- Post-War Era 1946-1966 - 111 buildings, 78 contributing

Architectural styles include Victorian, Classical Revival, Bungalow, Moderne, and other. Architects include Walter Ware, Alberto Treganza, Richard Kletting, Samuel Whitaker, and others.

Old Pioneer Fort Site, also known as Pioneer Park, is included as a contributing resource in the district.

== See also ==
- National Register of Historic Places listings in Salt Lake City, Utah
