= Lehi City Hall =

- U.S. National Register of Historic Places
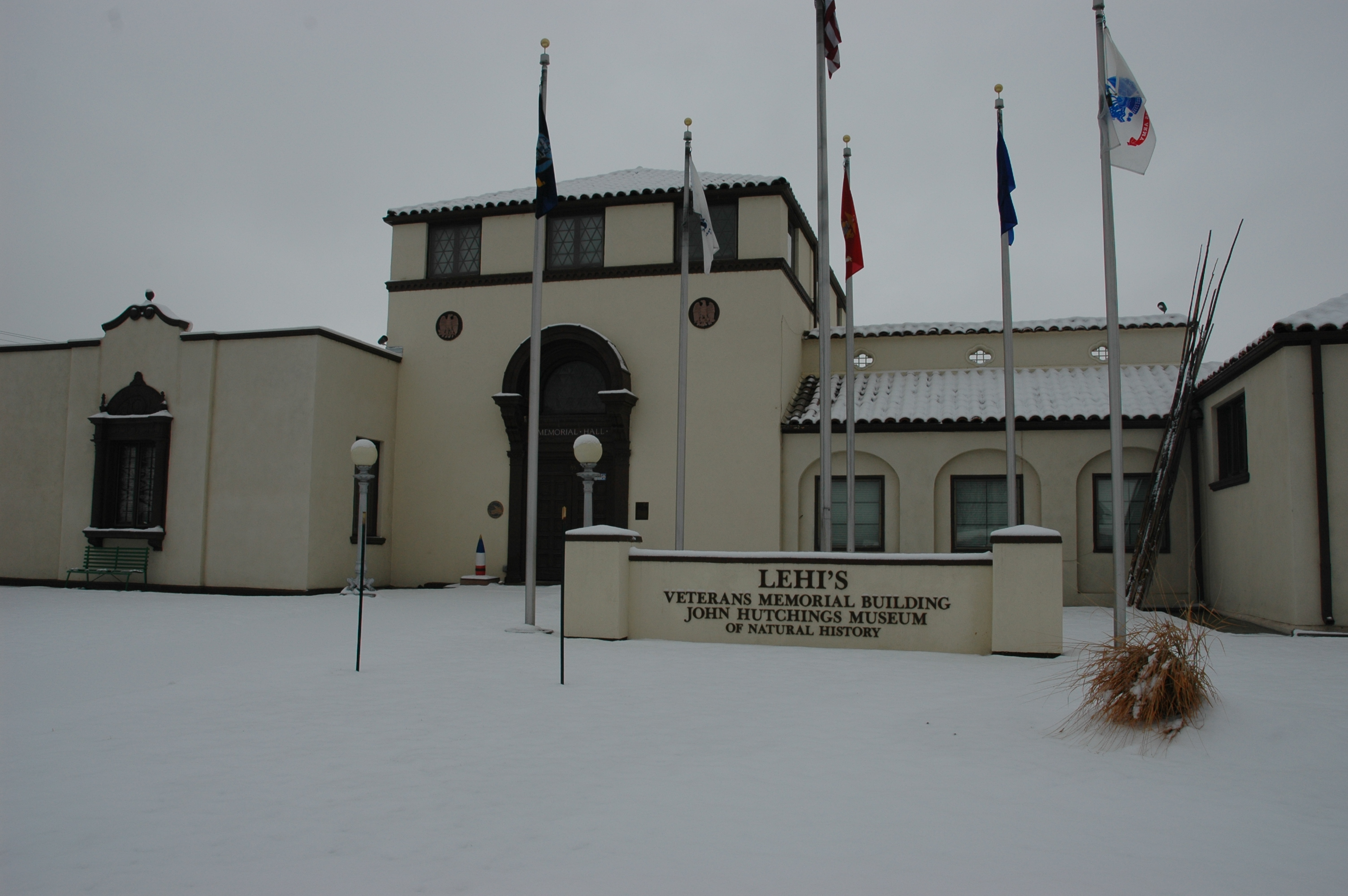

- Location within Utah Location within the United States
- Location: 51 N. Center St., Lehi, Utah
- Coordinates: 40°23′19″N 111°50′56″W
- Area: less than one acre
- Built: 1918-1926
- Architect: Ware, Walter E.; Treganza, Alberto O.
- Architectural style: Mission/Spanish Revival
- NRHP reference No.: 82004169
- Added to NRHP: March 1, 1982

The Lehi City Hall at 51 N. Center St. in Lehi, Utah, known also as Old Lehi City Hall, was built during 1918–1926. It was designed by architects Walter E. Ware and Alberto O. Treganza of Salt Lake City and is of Mission/Spanish Revival style.

It was built as a memorial building honoring World War I veterans; it was planned to serve as city hall, as a museum, and also as a library; it cost approximately $55,000 to build. It is believed to be the only large building designed by Ware and Treganza that uses the Mission/Spanish Revival style.

It was listed on the National Register of Historic Places in 1982.

== World War II ==
During World War II the upstairs of the memorial building was used as a look out for incoming planes near Geneva Steel. Because of the great amounts of steel the plant produced for the war, many feared that the Japanese would target the plant and the cities around it. The memorial had a direct view of the plant and was one of the tallest buildings in the area at the time.

== Museum ==
In 1995 the Hutchings Museum moved into the building occupying the Veterans Memorial. The Memorial now resides in the main hall of the Museum featuring artifacts from World War I, World War II, the Korean War, Vietnam War, and Desert Storm. The Hall also includes a list of the men and women from Lehi Utah who served in the wars.
