= John Hafen House =

Historic house in Utah, United States

- U.S. National Register of Historic Places
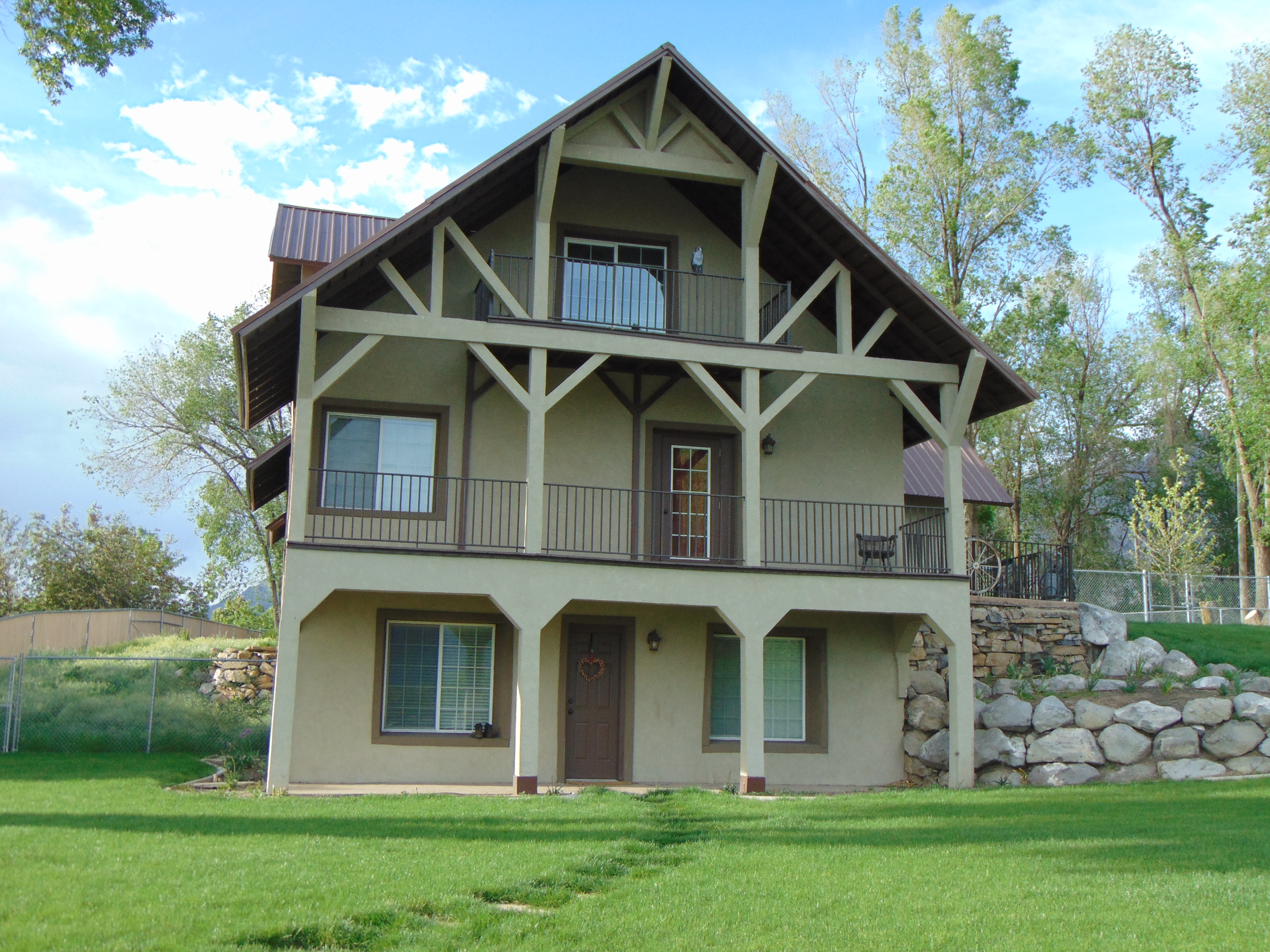
- South side of the John Hafen House

- Location within Utah Location within the United States
- Location: 1002 South Main Street, (Note: Although the official address of the John Hafen House is South Main Street in Springville, it is not accessible from that street. The house is actually located immediately east of Utah State Route 51 (SR-51) on the north side of a short section of gravel road (designated as 950 South) that extends east from SR-51. While the roadway continues east from SR-51 all the way to South Main Street, it crosses a set of Union Pacific Railroad tracks. The level crossing is considered private and is most often blocked by a closed gate.); Springville, Utah; United States
- Coordinates: 40°9′14″N 111°36′33″W
- Area: 1.06 acres (0.43 ha)
- Built: 1900
- Architect: Treganza, Alberto O.
- NRHP reference No.: 82004182
- Added to NRHP: July 23, 1982

The John Hafen House is a historic house located at 1002 South Main Street in Springville, Utah. It is locally significant primarily for its association with Hafen, an important Mormon artist.

== Description and history ==
The three-story brick and timber house was constructed in 1900, and was designed by architect Alberto Treganza for his friend John Hafen.

It was listed on the National Register of Historic Places on July 23, 1982.

== See also ==
- National Register of Historic Places listings in Utah County, Utah
