= Florence E. Ware =

American painter

Florence Ellen Ware (1891 – 1972) was an American artist from Utah. She was a painter and a professor of art at the University of Utah for 25 years. She is well known for her murals, sponsored by the WPA and painted in the university's Kingsbury Hall in 1936.

== Life and work ==
Ware was born in Salt Lake City, Utah. Her father was architect Walter E. Ware and her mother was Jennie M. Hartley. Her early life included an education in varied arts. She attended the University of Utah, and graduated first in her class at the Art Institute of Chicago,. Ware began teaching at the University of Utah in 1918. She was the first President of the Association of Utah Artists in 1940. Ware died in Salt Lake City in 1972.

Ware went on an 18-month tour of Europe and the Near East in 1928 where she completed several small paintings that fit into her box of oil paints. Her instructors included J.T. Harwood, Edwin Evans, Charles Hawthorne, and Anna Hills.

Ware designed the house murals, which depict "drama through the ages," of the Capitol Theatre in Salt Lake City, Utah, circa 1936, as part of a Works Progress Administration project.
