= Henderson Block =

Historic building in Salt Lake City, Utah, U.S.

- U.S. National Register of Historic Places
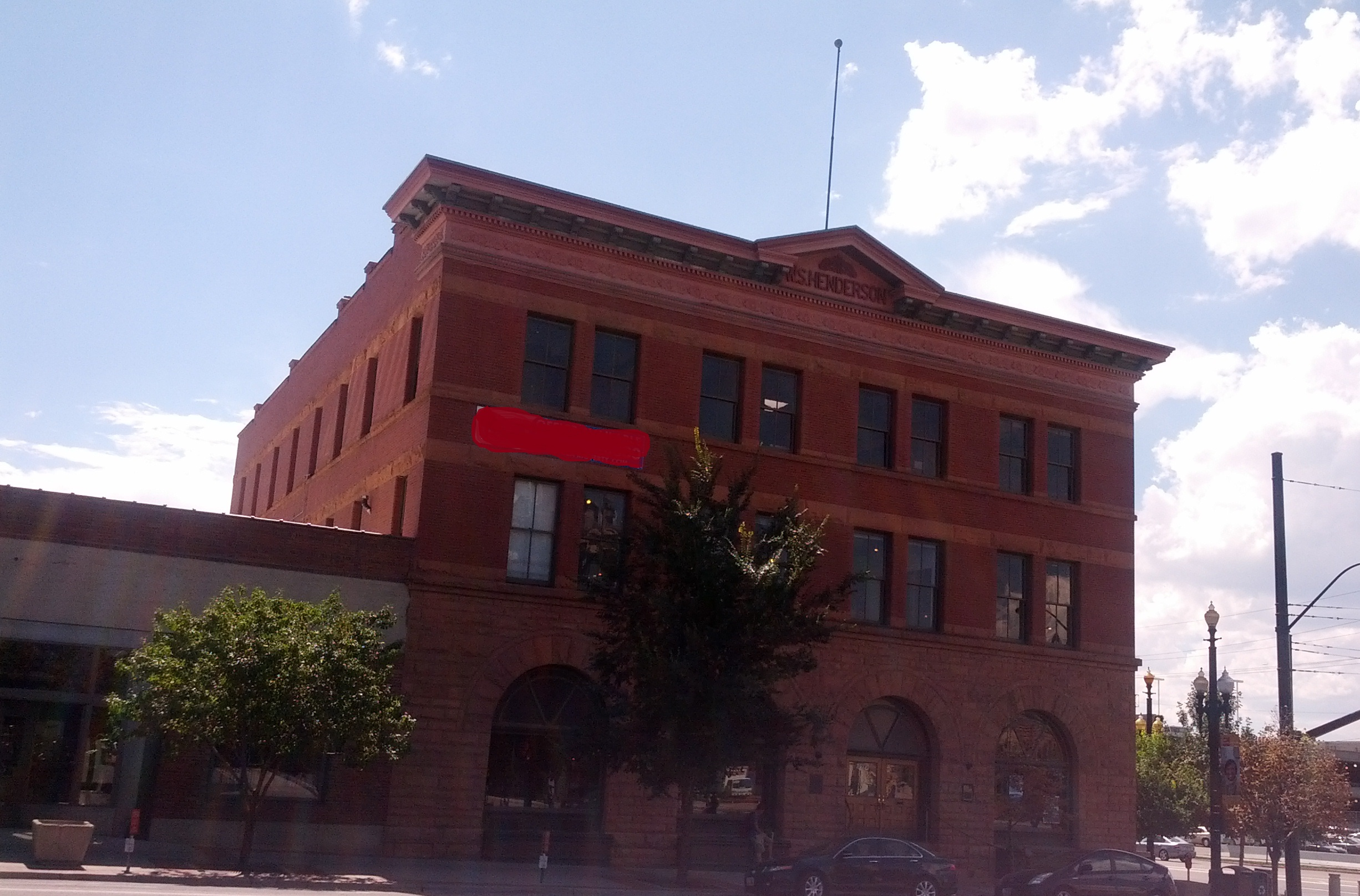

- Location within Utah Location within the United States
- Location: 375 W. 200 South, Salt Lake City, Utah
- Coordinates: 40°45′52″N 111°54′05″W
- Area: less than one acre
- Built: 1897-98
- Architect: Walter E. Ware
- Part of: Warehouse District (Salt Lake City, Utah)
- NRHP reference No.: 78002672
- Added to NRHP: January 30, 1978

The Henderson Block, at 375 W. 200 South in Salt Lake City, Utah was designed by architect Walter E. Ware and was built in 1897–98. It was listed on the National Register of Historic Places in 1978. It was also included as a contributing building in the Warehouse District.

It is a three-story warehouse with floor heights of 24, 20, and 16 feet. The original building is 74 by 100 feet (23 m × 30 m) in plan. It is built of masonry, with post and beam construction. Its upper levels are supported by three rows of wooden posts, which are built upon three rows of brick and stone load-bearing piers in the basement and street levels. It was expanded in 1936 by addition of a 51 by 50 feet (16 m × 15 m) one-story addition.

The warehouse is more decorated than most of its peers (brick warehouses in Utah). It was deemed one of the best-preserved early works of architect Ware, "and considered in the context of other period warehouses, represents a high achievement in warehouse architecture."

It was one of 16 buildings included in listing of the Warehouse District as a historic district in 1982.
