= Laramie Plains Museum =

Historic house in Wyoming, United States

- Ivinson Mansion and Grounds
- U.S. National Register of Historic Places
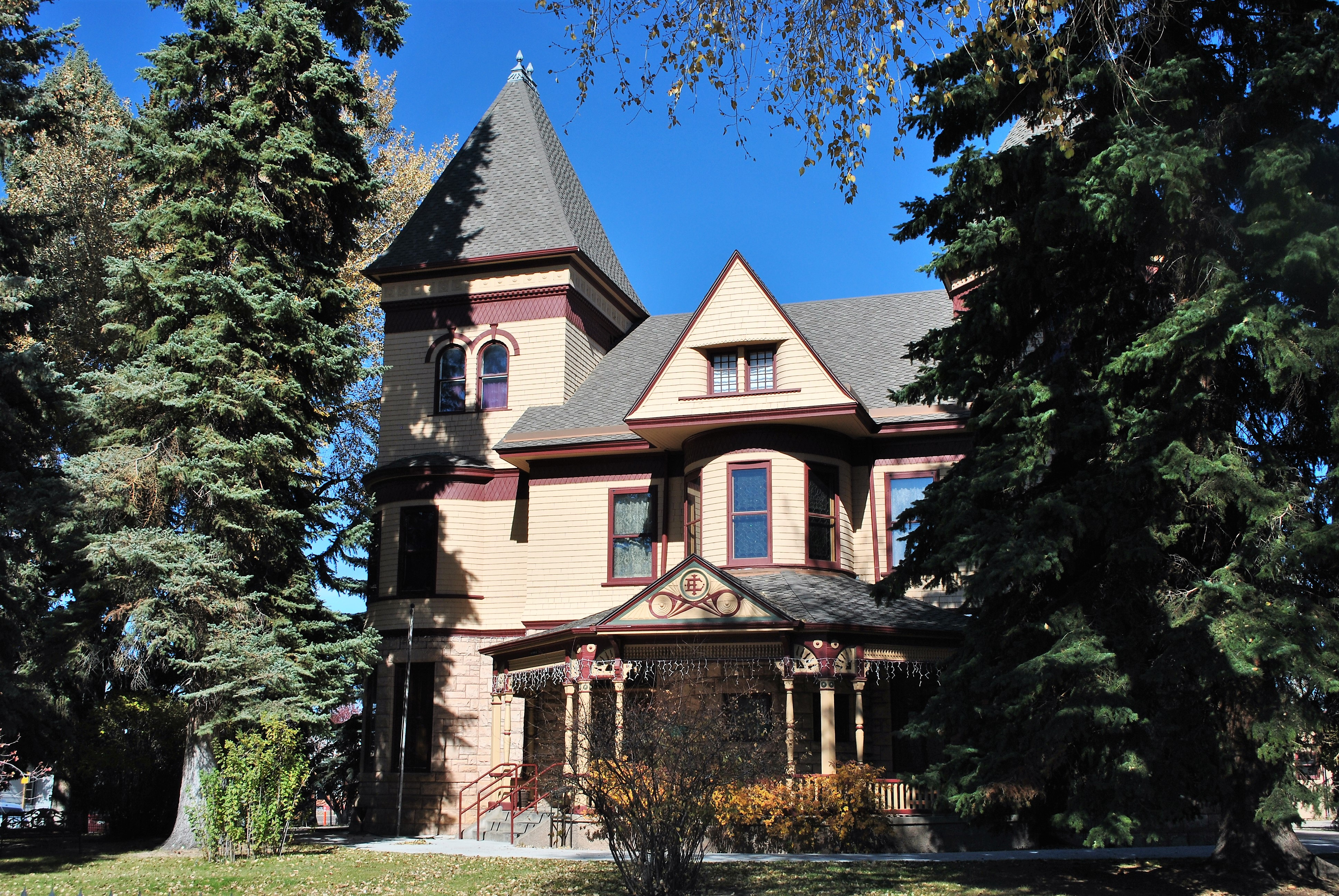

- Location within Wyoming Location within the United States
- Location: Lots 1--8, block 178, Laramie, Wyoming
- Coordinates: 41°18′44″N 105°35′18″W
- Area: 0 acres (0 ha)
- Built: 1892
- Architect: Walter E. Ware
- Architectural style: Late Victorian
- NRHP reference No.: 72001295
- Added to NRHP: February 23, 1972

The Ivinson Mansion, now the Laramie Plains Museum, was built in 1892 in Laramie, Wyoming by Jane and Edward Ivinson. Designed by architect Walter E. Ware of Salt Lake City and built by local contractor Frank Cook, the house was regarded as the most significant residence in Laramie at its completion. Edward Ivinson gave the mansion to the Episcopal Church, which used it as a boarding school until 1958. After years of neglect, the house was acquired by the Laramie Plains Museum Association in 1972 and is used as a museum and events center.

== Description ==
The Ivinson Mansion is a Victorian-style house with 11,726 square feet (1,089.4 m^{2}) of living space, with three floors and a basement. Its main level is built of stone, and the upper levels are of wood-frame construction. The front of the house is eight rooms wide, with lavishly detailed woodwork, tile and hardware. The left hand tower is square, with a steep pyramidal roof and a projecting rounded by, while the right turret is slightly smaller, octagonal in plan and surmounted by a curved bell-shaped roof. The central bay features a projecting one-story porch with Victorian detailing, with a curved bay above and a small, steep gable above the bay. The upper levels feature shingle style details, exemplified by the curved bays and rounded recessed window jambs. The rear of the house features a depressed roofline just above the second floor with partial dormers over the windows, which cut through the eaves. The hipped roof contrasts with the towered front elevation.

The property features a 2,647-square-foot (245.9 m^{2}) brick carriage house to the rear of the house. It was remodeled in 1921 for use as a school and renamed the Joslin Cottage. The Virginia Cottage, a nearby two-story stucco and frame building, built in 1924 and employing details from the house's rear wing shows some characteristics of the Prairie Style.

== History ==
Edward Ivinson was born on September 20, 1830, on River Estate, St. Croix Island in the Danish West Indies, the son of an immigrant from England. Edward's parents provided for his formal education in England where he remained until he emigrated to the United States in about 1852, to work New York. In 1854 he met and married Jane Wood, a 13-year-old English immigrant. Shortly thereafter the Ivinsons moved to Evansville, Indiana, then to Peoria, Illinois, where Edward became a naturalized United States citizen and worked in the dry goods business. In Peoria they adopted a young girl -- Margaret Ellen Watson, the daughter of a critically ill tailor. They raised her as their own and she would be the only child that the couple would ever have. From there they moved on to Memphis, Tennessee, probably in 1862.

In 1867 the Ivinsons decided to move to California. Edward left first and by early 1868 had decided to temporarily do business in a place that would eventually become Laramie, Wyoming (at the time Dakota Territory). Jane and their eleven-year-old daughter Maggie arrived in Laramie on 10 May 1868. Ivinson sold general merchandise, rapidly expanding his business. He also extended his reach into banking when he bought the only bank in town. He soon sold the dry goods store and devoted most of the next 50 years to his various banking businesses.

Jane Ivinson helped established the local Episcopal Church and the city's first public school. Jane would remain influential in the local social scene for many years. She was also, however, engaged in the Ivinson banking business, being on the board of directors of Ivinson's Wyoming National Bank. Jane also owned several parcels of land in and near the city, much of which would eventually be conveyed to the Episcopal Church through the Ivinson's estate.

Maggie Ivinson married Galusha B. Grow on her 21st birthday in 1878. Galusha was from a prominent Pennsylvania family. He had moved west to experience life on the frontier probably due to the influence of his uncle Galusha A. Grow, the Speaker of the United States House of Representatives. The Grows would eventually move to San Diego, California, where the Ivinsons had wintered on several occasions.

Edward and Jane sold their shares in the Wyoming National Bank in 1888. His next major banking move was to purchase Merchants National Bank in San Diego in 1893. Galusha ran the bank for him until his untimely death in 1903. Shortly thereafter, Ivinson sold the bank at great profit and reentered the banking business in Laramie, Wyoming when he purchased a large share in the First National Bank. He would remain part of that business until 1922 when he finally retired.

At the urging of Wyoming Republican party leaders, Edward mounted an unsuccessful run for governor of the newly created state of Wyoming in 1892. He was later elected mayor of Laramie in 1918, serving one term. Jane Ivinson died on November 9, 1915. Upon her death, Ivinson turned his attentions to philanthropy. Over the course of the next 10 years he would pay for the construction of a modern hospital in Laramie, fund the completion of the city's St. Matthew's Cathedral, erect a monument to veterans of the First World War and donate significant parcels of property to the Episcopal Church (most of which had originally been in his wife's name).

In 1921 Edward deeded the house and grounds of his palatial mansion to the Episcopal Church. The church used the estate as a boarding school for girls, adding the Virginia Cottage in 1924 and finally closing in 1958. He remarried in 1921 at the age of 90 to Augusta Haley, the 78-year-old widow of a deceased family friend and oft time business partner Ora Haley. The couple lived together for only a few months before they separated and eventually divorced.

Shortly before Ivinson's death, Ivinson created a trust funded by his entire remaining estate to build and maintain a home for elderly ladies. It had long been a dream of his first wife Jane to secure a place for ladies without means, where they could comfortably live their remaining years. Edward Ivinson died on April 9, 1928, at the age of 97 in his suite of rooms in the Brown Palace Hotel in Denver, Colorado. After his death, the trust constructed the facility which is still in operation today. The Ivinson Home for Ladies occupies its beautiful original structure in Laramie, Wyoming and still relies in part on the Ivinson trust for its operations.

The mansion Edward gave to the Episcopal Church was eventually abandoned when it became a burden on the church's finances. It fell into ruin after the closure of the school, but was acquired by the Laramie Plains Museum Association in 1972. The restored house houses the museum's collections and offices, and is used for events. It was listed on the National Register of Historic Places on February 3, 1972.
