= Thomas R. Cutler Mansion =

Historic house in Utah, United States

- U.S. National Register of Historic Places
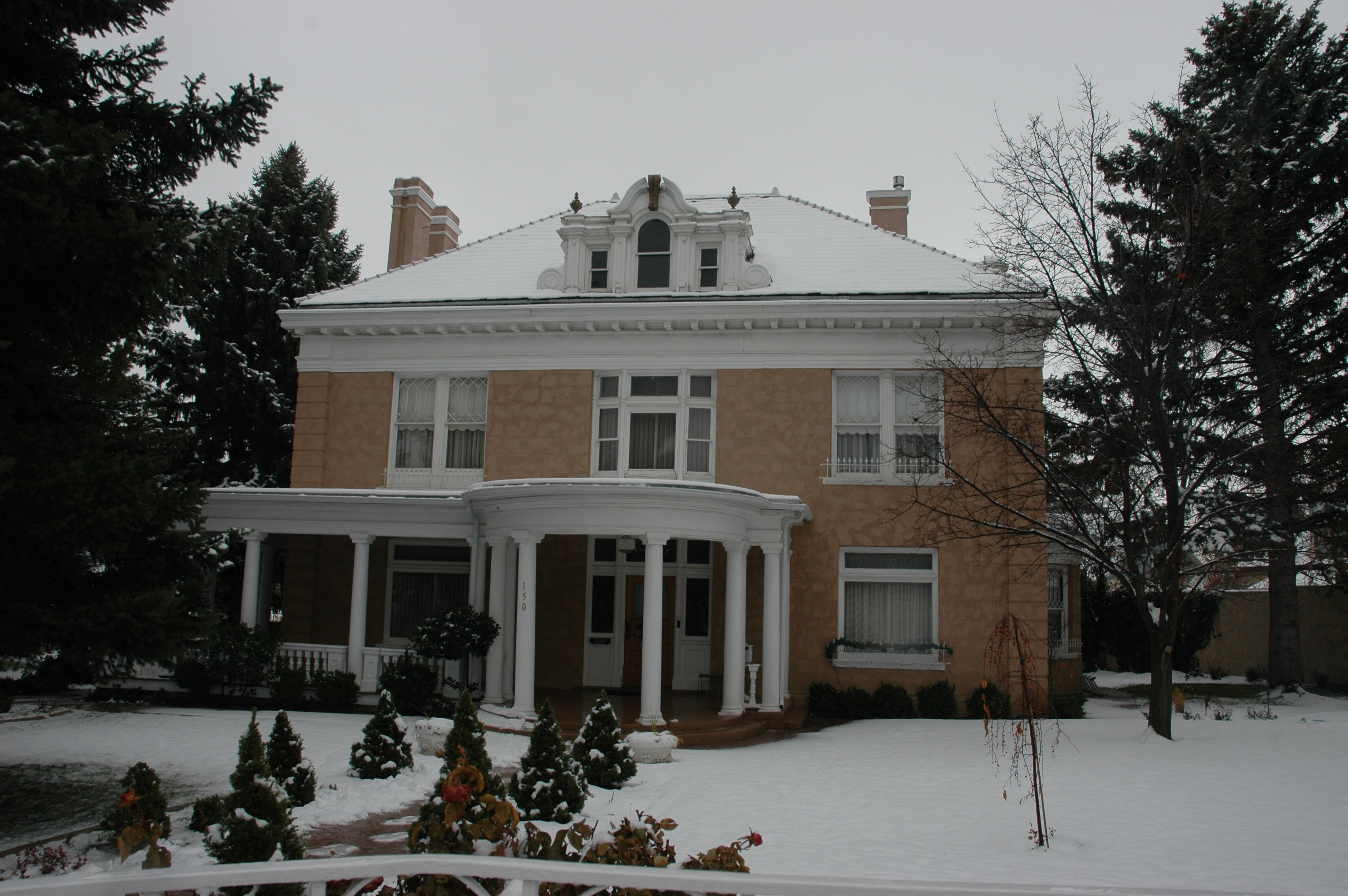

- Location within Utah Location within the United States
- Location: 150 E. State St., Lehi, Utah
- Coordinates: 40°23′45″N 111°50′42″W
- Area: less than one acre
- Built: 1900
- Architect: possibly Ware, Walter
- Architectural style: Colonial Revival
- NRHP reference No.: 84002427
- Added to NRHP: July 12, 1984

The Thomas R. Cutler Mansion at 150 E. State St. in Lehi, Utah, United States, was built in 1900. It was possibly designed by architect Walter Ware. It was listed on the National Register of Historic Places in 1984.

In 1984 it was deemed "historically significant as the home of Thomas R. Cutler, a prominent Utah businessman" and architecturally significant "as one of a very limited number of Colonial Revival boxes in Utah, and as the only documented extant example of the type in a small town in Utah."
