= Iglesia La Luz del Mundo (Salt Lake City) =

Historic church in Salt Lake City, Utah, U.S.

- First Church of Christ, Scientist
- U.S. National Register of Historic Places
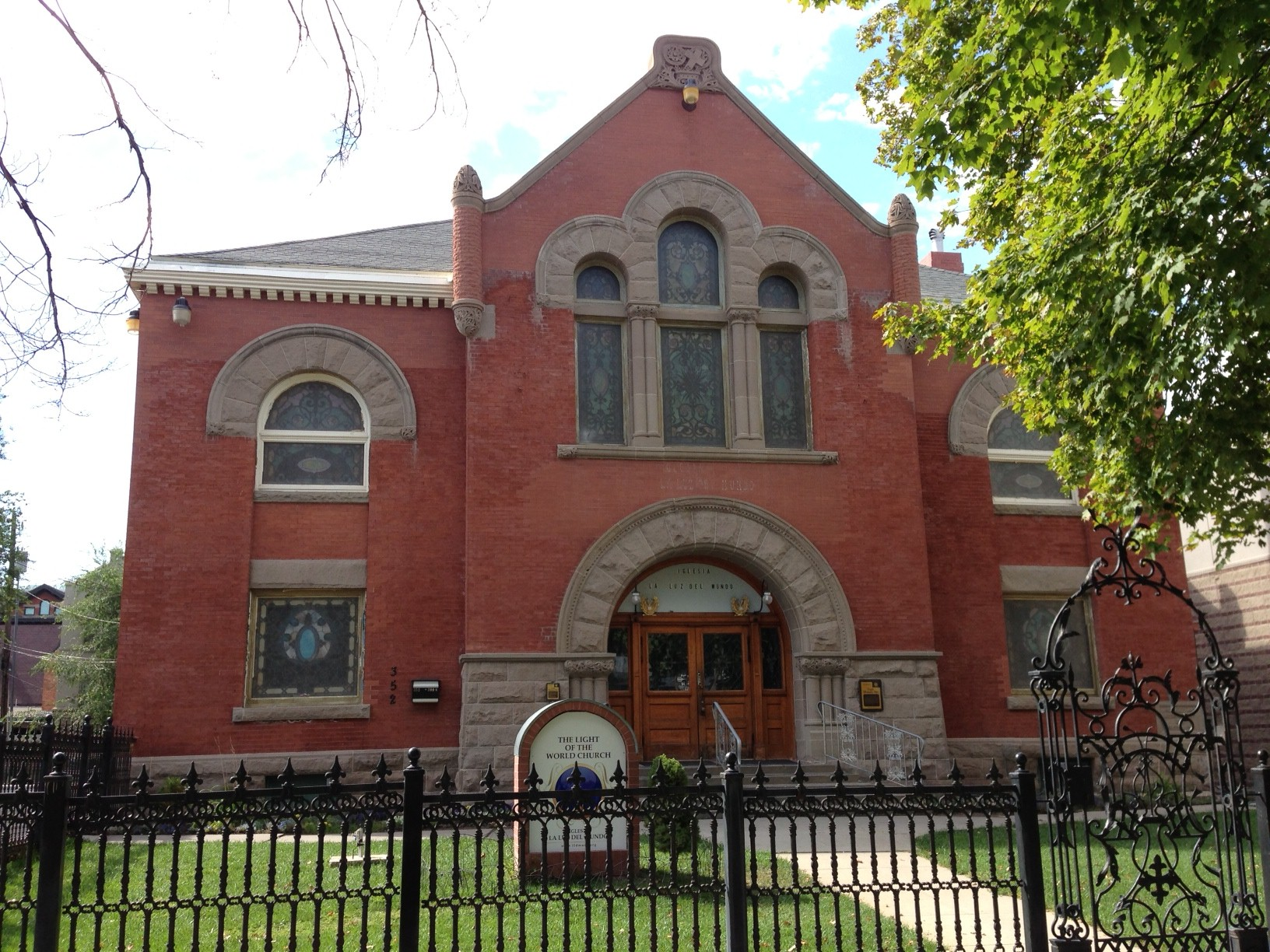
- Location: 352 East 300 South; Salt Lake City, Utah; United States
- Coordinates: 40°45′45″N 111°52′50.5″W
- Built: 1898
- Architect: Walter E. Ware
- Architectural style: Richardsonian Romanesque
- NRHP reference No.: 76001824
- Added to NRHP: July 30, 1976

Iglesia La Luz del Mundo is a historic church located in Salt Lake City, Utah, United States. Originally built as the First Church of Christ, Scientist, on July 30, 1976 it was added to the National Register of Historic Places.

== History ==
First Church of Christ, Scientist, was organized on July 17, 1891, and was the first Christian Science church in Utah. The church building, designed by local architect, Walter E. Ware, in the Richardsonian Romanesque style, was built in 1898 of brick and Utah Kyune sandstone. After being completely paid for, it was dedicated on November 27, 1898.

== Current use ==
The Christian Science Church left the building in 2002. After being used for a time by Anthony's Fine Art and Antiques, the building is once again being used as a church. Iglesia La Luz del Mundo has used the building since about 2006.

== See also ==
- National Register of Historic Places listings in Salt Lake City
- List of former Christian Science churches, societies and buildings
- First Church of Christ, Scientist (disambiguation)
