= Morton A. Cheesman House =

Historic house in Utah, United States

- U.S. National Register of Historic Places
- Location within Utah Location within the United States
- Location: 2320 Walker Lane, Holladay, Utah
- Coordinates: 40°38′56″N 111°49′19″W
- Area: 1 acre (0.40 ha)
- Built: 1912-13
- Architect: Walter Ware; Alberto O. Treganza
- Architectural style: Bungalow/craftsman
- NRHP reference No.: 82004137
- Added to NRHP: July 23, 1982

The Morton A. Cheesman House, at 2320 Walker Lane in what is now Holladay, Utah, was built in 1912–13. It was listed on the National Register of Historic Places in 1982.

It is a two-story Craftsman-style house with a cobble-rock base.

It was designed by the Salt Lake City firm of Ware & Treganza, which had principals Walter Ware and Alberto O. Treganza.

Its significance:

The Mort Cheesmen House, built in 1912-13, is significant as one of a very limited number of large scale Craftsman houses in Utah, and as an outstanding and unique example of that type. It is one of two monumental and unique Craftsman homes designed by the successful Salt Lake architectural firm, Ware and Treganza, the other example being the Knight-Mangum house in Provo. Alberto O. Treganza, the principal designer of the firm, had worked for the famous San Diego firm of Hebbard and Gill, and the design of the Cheesman house may reflect the influence of that experience. It is a distinctive example of the Craftsman style because of its single axis orientation, and its unorthodox point of entry. The combination of stucco and cobble rock as building materials, while not unusual, is not common in Utah, especially in large homes. It was more often reserved for use in Craftsman Bungalows.
