= Converse Hall =

Historic building in Salt Lake City, Utah, U.S.

- U.S. National Register of Historic Places
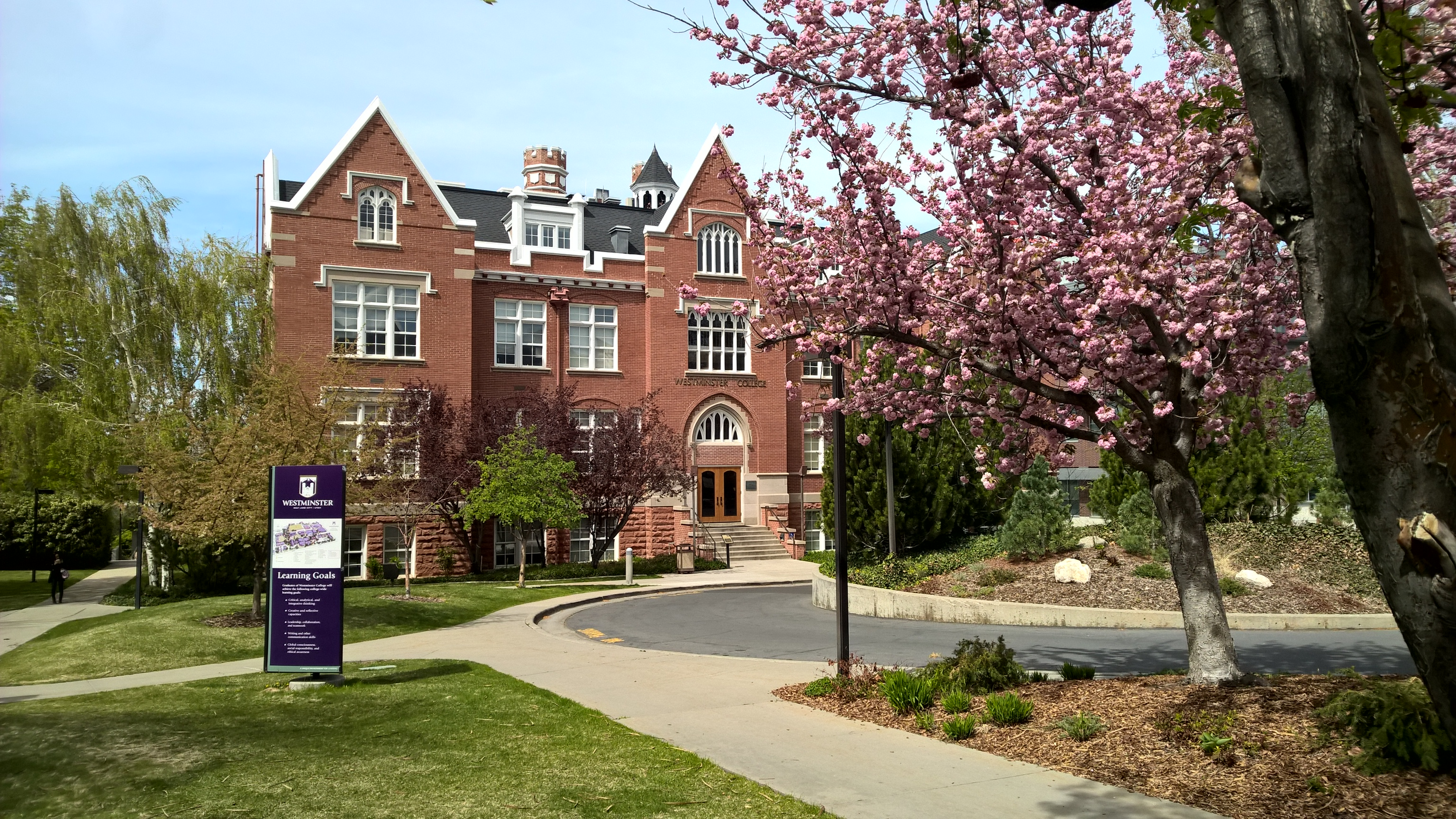

- Location within Utah Location within the United States
- Location: 1840 South 13th East; Salt Lake City, Utah; United States
- Coordinates: 40°43′55″N 111°51′14″W
- Area: less than one acre
- Built: 1906
- Architect: Erskine & Liljenberg
- Architectural style: Tudor Revival, Jacobethan Revival
- NRHP reference No.: 78002685
- Added to NRHP: April 20, 1978

Converse Hall is one of the oldest and central buildings on the campus of Westminster University in Salt Lake City, Utah, United States. It was listed on the National Register of Historic Places in 1978.

== Description ==
The 3 1/2-story masonry structure was built out of red brick and white stone in the Jacobethan and Tudor Revival styles. It was the first building erected for the college in 1906, to a design by the Salt Lake City architectural firm of Erskine and Liljenberg, and is a regionally rare example of this unusual architectural style. The building suffered extensive damage in a fire early in the morning of 12 March 1926, but was rebuilt and re-opened in September of that year.

== Gallery ==
in the early 2000s

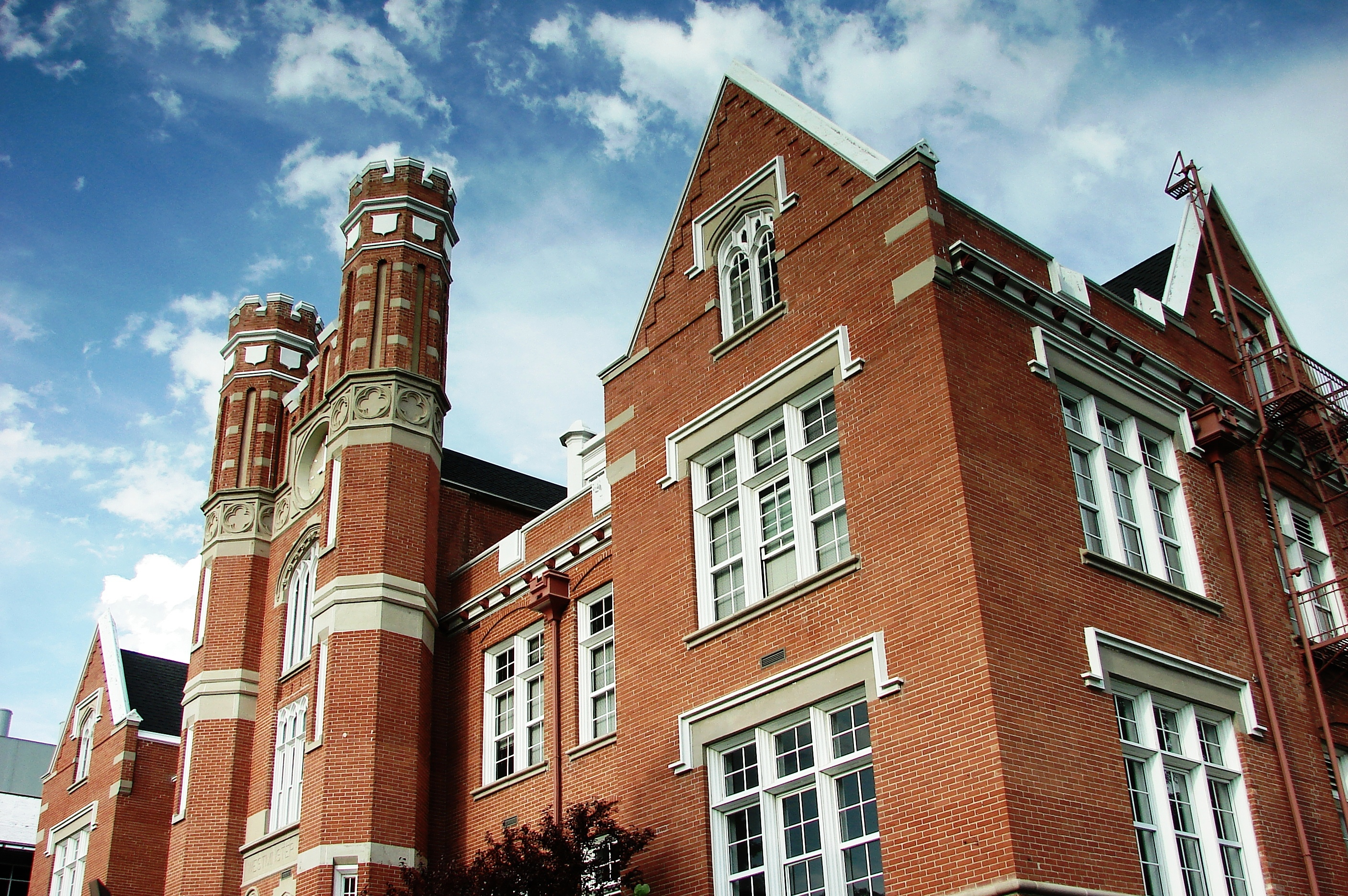
2008

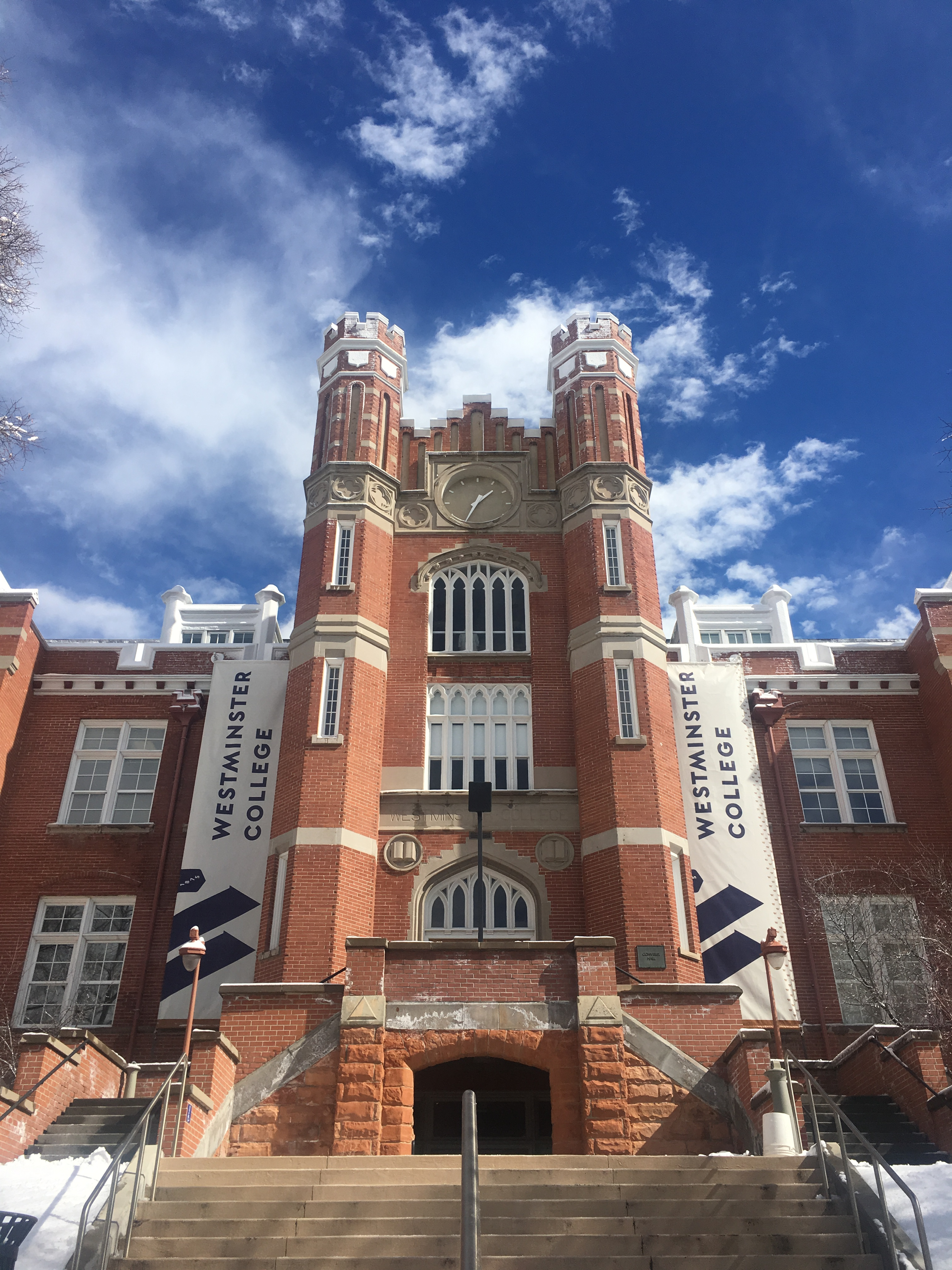
March 2017

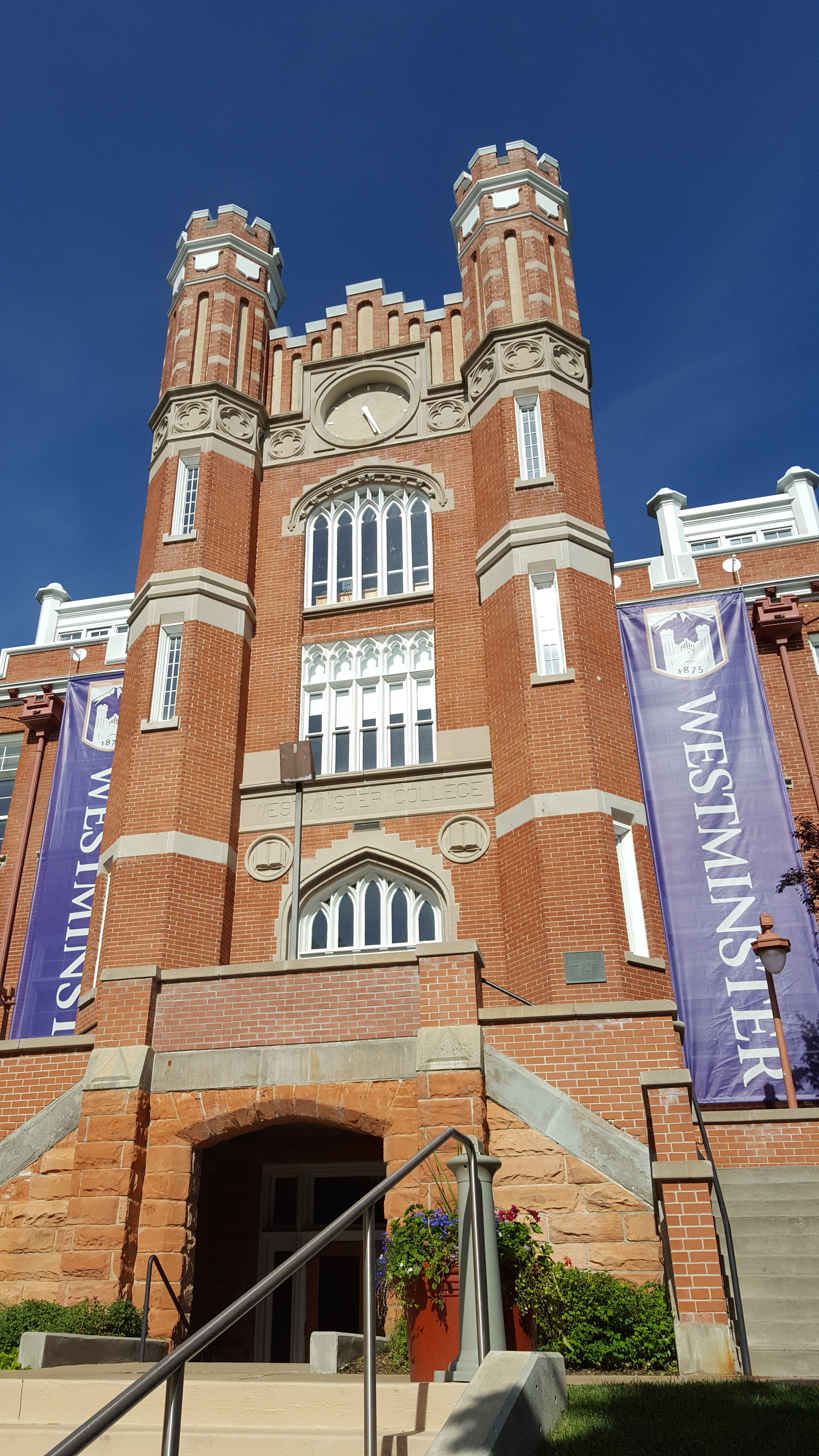
2016

== See also ==
- National Register of Historic Places listings in Salt Lake City
