= Alberto O. Treganza =

American architect

Alberto Owen Treganza, sometimes known as Albert Treganza or A.O. Treganza (March 24, 1876 in Colorado – July 18, 1944 in San Diego, California), was an American architect and ornithologist in the early 20th century.

== Architectural career ==
Treganza trained at a technical school in Healdsburg, California, and then took architectural classes under William S. Hebbard. He was later employed in San Diego, California, for Hebbard's firm he had formed with Irving Gill (Hebbard & Gill) where he learned contemporary architectural styles, including modern, craftsman and prairie school styles. He moved to Salt Lake City in 1900 and formed Ware & Treganza with Walter E. Ware, a partnership that continued for 25 years from 1901 to 1926. Treganza and Ware were prolific designers during a building boom in Utah. One of his first works was designing the home of an artist and friend John Hafen, which still stands in Springville, Utah, and is listed on the National Register of Historic Places as John Hafen House. Treganza has many of his architectural designs listed on the U.S. National Register of Historic Places with his design partner Ware.

In 1926 he moved with his family to Florida for a short time before returning to Lemon Grove, California. In California, Treganza continued to design many civic buildings and homes in the Spanish revival style such as the MacGregor house in Lemon Grove and the former San Diego Police Department in San Diego. Treganza was a member of the American Institute of Architects from 1921 until his death in 1944.

== Ornithology ==
Treganza was an avid birder throughout his life. The subspecies Ardea herodias treganzai, commonly known as the "Treganza blue heron" was discovered by Treganza on Antelope Island in the Great Salt Lake in 1907. Treganza, with his family amassed a collection of 30,000 bird eggs from around the world that have since been portioned out into various museums. Treganza and his second wife, Antwonet Kaufman, were both active members of the Cooper Ornithological Club and she wrote a weekly birding column in the San Diego Union for many years between 1926 and 1940.

== Personal life ==
Treganza married Alma Stevens, who died at the age of 34 in San Diego in 1910. They were the parents of Mary E. and Josephine E. Treganza. He later remarried to Antwonet Kaufman and they were the parents of Dr. Amorita Treganza, a noted pediatric optometrist in San Diego (and who the Annual Treganza Essay Contest in Lemon Grove is named after), Adán Treganza, a well-known anthropologist at San Francisco State University who the Treganza Anthropology Museum is named after, and Adalaida Maria Treganza, a mother of four and an accomplished elementary school educator who taught in East San Diego County for twenty-five years. Treganza also founded the Lions Club in Salt Lake City in 1922.

== Images of architectural works ==
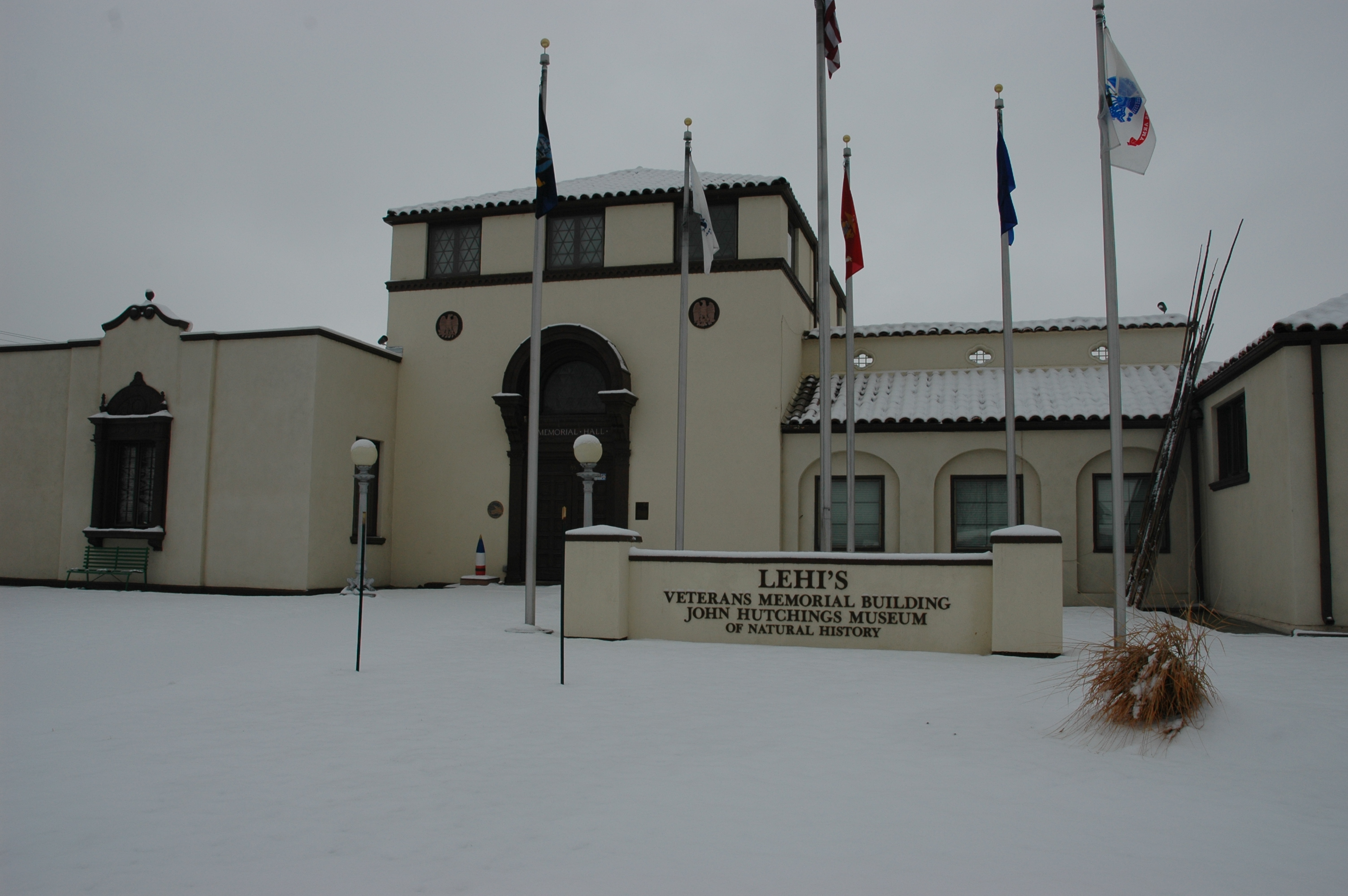
Lehi City Hall (1926)

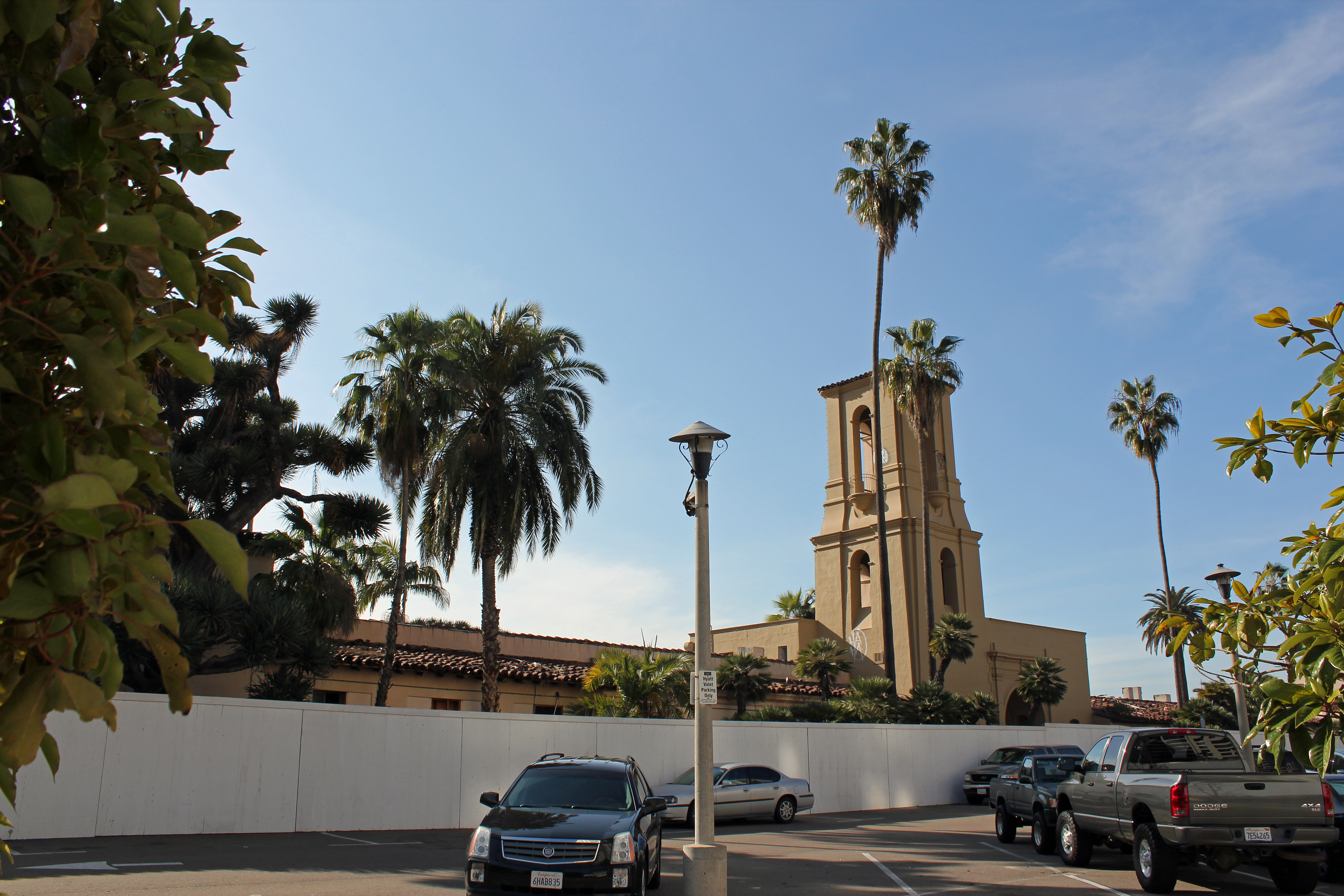
Former San Diego Police Headquarters (1939)

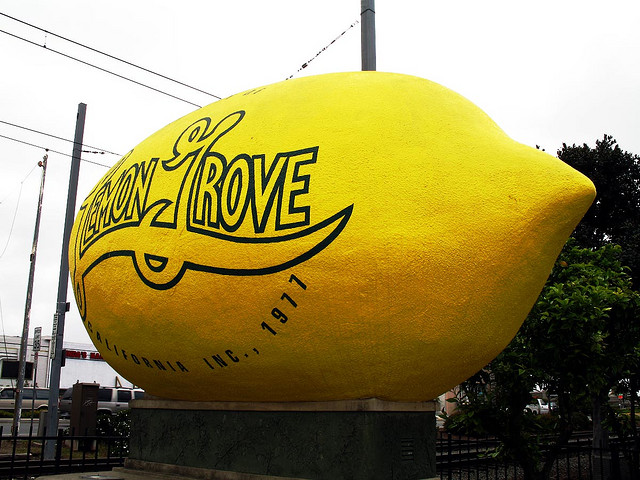
Lemon Grove Monument

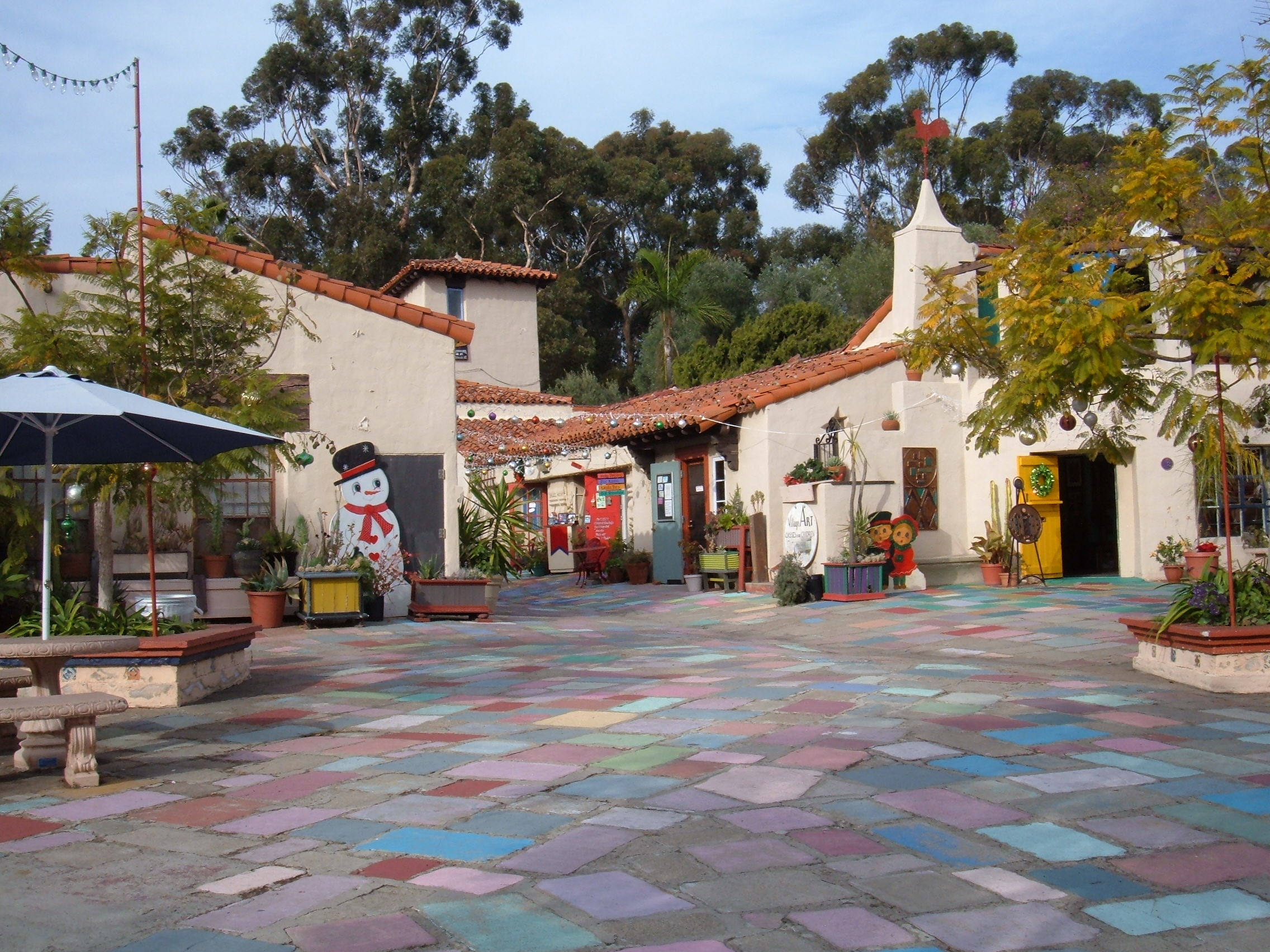
Spanish Village buildings in Balboa Park

== Other Individual Works ==
- Morton A. Cheesman House, 2320 Walker Lane, Salt Lake City, UT, *NRHP listed
- John Hafen House, 956 S. Main St., Springville, UT, *NRHP listed
- Alberto O. Treganza House (1909), 1135 East 600 South, Salt Lake City, UT
- MacGregor House, 3260-3262 Main St., Lemon Grove, CA
- House, 7365 Remley Place, La Jolla, CA
- Bank Building (Currently Randall Lamb engineering firm) (1942), 4757 Palm Ave. La Mesa, CA 91941
- Albert G. Wheeler Residence (1928) 4005 Acacia Ave., Bonita, CA

== See also ==
For a listing of works completed in partnership with Walter E. Ware see Ware & Treganza.

Treganza Family Collection, Lemon Grove Historical Society.
